= Doctor Who season 7 =

1970 season of British sci-fi TV series

Doctor Who
- Season 7
- Cover art of the Blu-ray release for the complete season
- Starring: Jon Pertwee; Caroline John; Nicholas Courtney; John Levene
- No. of stories: 4
- No. of episodes: 25

Release
- Original network: BBC1
- Original release: 3 January – 20 June 1970

Season chronology
- ← Previous; Season 6 Next → Season 8

The seventh season of British science fiction television series Doctor Who began on 3 January 1970 with Jon Pertwee's first story Spearhead from Space and ended with Inferno. The first season to be made in colour, it marked the beginning of Barry Letts's five seasons as series producer, but it has been described as "essentially devised" by his predecessor, Derrick Sherwin, who produced the opening story. The season sees the beginning of the Doctor's exile to Earth by the Time Lords and his attachment to UNIT as its scientific advisor.

This season is the first one that does not suffer from any missing episodes; all four serials are complete.

== Casting ==
=== Main cast ===
- Jon Pertwee as the Third Doctor
- Caroline John as Liz Shaw
- Nicholas Courtney as Brigadier Lethbridge-Stewart

Jon Pertwee makes his first appearance as the Third Doctor, replacing Patrick Troughton in the role. Caroline John makes her first appearance as companion and assistant Liz Shaw in Spearhead from Space and last in Inferno. Nicholas Courtney returns as Brigadier Lethbridge-Stewart and he would continue to make regular appearances in Doctor Who until season 13.

=== Recurring cast ===
- John Levene as Sergeant Benton

John Levene also makes his first appearance as Sergeant Benton since The Invasion in The Ambassadors of Death and would continue to make regular appearances until season 13.

== Development ==
From this season onwards the programme was produced in colour. Barry Letts also took over as producer, beginning with the second serial, Doctor Who and the Silurians, when Derrick Sherwin left to co-produce another BBC series, Paul Temple. The number of episodes in a season was cut to accommodate the new production methods: season 6 has 44 episodes; season 7 has 25 episodes. The seasons would continue to have between 20 and 28 episodes until season 22. Following the opening four parter, the remaining episodes were divided into three serials each of seven episodes.

Setting the entire season on Earth had been the choice of Sherwin, who had introduced the military organisation UNIT in his earlier serial The Invasion (1968), which he had written and Peter Bryant had produced. Sherwin had also produced the final black-and-white serial, The War Games (1969), in which the Second Doctor had been put on trial by the Time Lords and exiled to Earth in the 20th century. In Spearhead from Space the Doctor becomes, despite his initial reluctance, UNIT's scientific advisor on a regular basis, which would continue into Tom Baker's first two seasons as the Fourth Doctor. According to Sherwin on his DVD commentary for Spearhead from Space, the BBC had considered replacing Doctor Who with a new Quatermass serial, but this fell through because Nigel Kneale was not interested in that, nor writing for Doctor Who when Sherwin had approached him about it. The plan did, however, have an effect on the Earth-based style of the programme, with Quatermass cited as an influence on season 7.

Spearhead from Space was intended to be produced identically to previous serials and others in the season, with a mixture of location material shot on 16mm film and studio material on videotape. Owing to industrial action by studio technicians at the BBC, the planned studio recording sessions were cancelled, with instead all four episodes being shot on location on 16mm film.

=== Scrapped stories ===
Several stories were scrapped for this season. The Circles of Power, written by Brian Hayles, would have focused on a faulty communications satellite which causes the release of robotic "sensorspheres", inducing amnesia in their victims. Brian Wright's The Mists of Madness would have seen the Doctor discover a community of artifically-created humans, though was scrapped due to Wright taking up an academic post in Bristol. Charlotte and Dennis Plimmer subsequently drafted The Shadow People, considered for the finale of the season after The Mists of Madness' cancellation. However, due to pay disputes with the writers, the serial was scrapped in favor of Inferno.

== Serials ==
No. story	No. in season	Serial title	Episode titles	Directed by	Written by	Original release date	Prod. code	UK viewers (millions)	AI
51	1	Spearhead from Space	"Episode 1"	Derek Martinus	Robert Holmes	3 January 1970	AAA	8.4	54
51	1	Spearhead from Space	"Episode 2"	Derek Martinus	Robert Holmes	10 January 1970	AAA	8.1	—
51	1	Spearhead from Space	"Episode 3"	Derek Martinus	Robert Holmes	17 January 1970	AAA	8.3	—
51	1	Spearhead from Space	"Episode 4"	Derek Martinus	Robert Holmes	24 January 1970	AAA	8.1	57
The newly regenerated Doctor is exiled to Earth in the 20th century. The Doctor has to devise a way to destroy the Autons before they kill humanity.
52	2	Doctor Who and the Silurians	"Episode 1"	Timothy Combe	Malcolm Hulke	31 January 1970	BBB	8.8	58
52	2	Doctor Who and the Silurians	"Episode 2"	Timothy Combe	Malcolm Hulke	7 February 1970	BBB	7.3	58
52	2	Doctor Who and the Silurians	"Episode 3"	Timothy Combe	Malcolm Hulke	14 February 1970	BBB	7.5	57
52	2	Doctor Who and the Silurians	"Episode 4"	Timothy Combe	Malcolm Hulke	21 February 1970	BBB	8.2	60
52	2	Doctor Who and the Silurians	"Episode 5"	Timothy Combe	Malcolm Hulke	28 February 1970	BBB	7.5	58
52	2	Doctor Who and the Silurians	"Episode 6"	Timothy Combe	Malcolm Hulke	7 March 1970	BBB	7.2	57
52	2	Doctor Who and the Silurians	"Episode 7"	Timothy Combe	Malcolm Hulke	14 March 1970	BBB	7.5	58
The Silurians, the original inhabitants of the Earth, have been awakened from their hibernation in the caves.
53	3	The Ambassadors of Death	"Episode 1"	Michael Ferguson	David Whitaker and Trevor Ray (uncredited)	21 March 1970	CCC	7.1	60
53	3	The Ambassadors of Death	"Episode 2"	Michael Ferguson	David Whitaker and Malcolm Hulke (uncredited)	28 March 1970	CCC	7.6	61
53	3	The Ambassadors of Death	"Episode 3"	Michael Ferguson	David Whitaker and Malcolm Hulke (uncredited)	4 April 1970	CCC	8.0	59
53	3	The Ambassadors of Death	"Episode 4"	Michael Ferguson	Malcolm Hulke (credited to David Whitaker)	11 April 1970	CCC	9.3	58
53	3	The Ambassadors of Death	"Episode 5"	Michael Ferguson	Malcolm Hulke (credited to David Whitaker)	18 April 1970	CCC	7.1	—
53	3	The Ambassadors of Death	"Episode 6"	Michael Ferguson	Malcolm Hulke (credited to David Whitaker)	25 April 1970	CCC	6.9	61
53	3	The Ambassadors of Death	"Episode 7"	Michael Ferguson	Malcolm Hulke (credited to David Whitaker)	2 May 1970	CCC	6.4	62
The British space programme oversees the launch of the Recovery Seven probe that has been sent to Mars to make contact with the missing Mars Probe Seven and its two astronauts, who lost contact with Earth eight months earlier. Van Lyden makes contact with the Probe but is then silenced by a piercing unearthly sound.
54	4	Inferno	"Episode 1"	Douglas Camfield	Don Houghton	9 May 1970	DDD	5.7	61
54	4	Inferno	"Episode 2"	Douglas Camfield	Don Houghton	16 May 1970	DDD	5.9	61
54	4	Inferno	"Episode 3"	Douglas Camfield and Barry Letts (uncredited)	Don Houghton	23 May 1970	DDD	4.8	60
54	4	Inferno	"Episode 4"	Douglas Camfield and Barry Letts (uncredited)	Don Houghton	30 May 1970	DDD	6.0	60
54	4	Inferno	"Episode 5"	Douglas Camfield and Barry Letts (uncredited)	Don Houghton	6 June 1970	DDD	5.4	—
54	4	Inferno	"Episode 6"	Douglas Camfield and Barry Letts (uncredited)	Don Houghton	13 June 1970	DDD	6.7	58
54	4	Inferno	"Episode 7"	Douglas Camfield and Barry Letts (uncredited)	Don Houghton	20 June 1970	DDD	5.5	60
Inferno is the nickname given to a project to penetrate the Earth's crust. The project, however, has its own problems and the Doctor is sent to an alternate universe.

== Broadcast ==
The entire season was broadcast from 3 January to 20 June 1970.

== Home media ==
=== VHS releases ===
Season	Story no.	Serial name	Duration	Release date		
Season	Story no.	Serial name	Duration	UK	Australia	USA / Canada
7	51	Spearhead from Space	1 × 100 min.	February 1988	April 1990	April 1991
7	51	Spearhead from Space	4 × 25 min.	February 1995	—N/a	—N/a
7	52	Doctor Who and the Silurians	7 × 25 min.	July 1993 (2 × VHS)	November 1993	June 1995 (2 × VHS)
7	53	The Ambassadors of Death	7 × 25 min.	May 2002	July 2002	October 2003 (2 × VHS)
7	54	The Pertwee Years; Inferno (Note: Episode 7)	1 × 25 min.	March 1992	October 1992	October 1992
7	54	Inferno	7 × 25 min.	May 1994 (2 × VHS)	July 1994	September 1995 (2 × VHS)

=== DVD and Blu-ray releases ===
All releases are for DVD unless otherwise indicated:

- ^{(B)} indicates a Blu-ray release

Season	Story no.	Serial name	Duration	Release date		
Season	Story no.	Serial name	Duration	R2	R4	R1
7	51	Spearhead from Space	4 × 25 min.	29 January 2001	7 September 2001	11 September 2001
7	51	Spearhead from Space (Special Edition) (Note: Only available as part of the Mannequin Mania box set in Regions 2 and 4. Only available individually in Region 1.)	4 × 25 min.	9 May 2011	2 June 2011	14 August 2012
7	51	Spearhead from Space (Blu-ray Edition) (Note: Includes bonus features exclusive to Blu-ray)	4 × 25 min.	15 July 2013	17 July 2013	13 August 2013
7	52	Doctor Who and the Silurians (Note: Only available as part of the Beneath the Surface box set in Regions 2 and 4. Available individually or in the box set in Region 1.)	7 × 25 min.	14 January 2008	5 March 2008	3 June 2008
7	53	The Ambassadors of Death	7 × 25 min.	1 October 2012	3 October 2012	9 October 2012
7	54	Inferno	7 × 25 min.	19 June 2006	6 July 2006	5 September 2006
7	54	Inferno (Special Edition)	7 × 25 min.	27 May 2013	5 June 2013	11 June 2013
7	51–54	Complete Season 7 (Note: Released as Doctor Who: The Collection – Season 7 in Region B. Released as Doctor Who – Jon Pertwee: Complete Season One in Region A.)	25 × 25 min.	3 March 2025 ^{(B)}	4 June 2025 ^{(B)}	3 June 2025

== In print ==
Season	Story no.	Library no. (Note: Number in Target's Doctor Who Library, if applicable)	Novelisation title	Author	Hardcover release date (Note: Published by Target's parent companies (Allen Wingate, W. H. Allen, BBC Books) unless otherwise indicated)	Paperback release date (Note: Published by Target Books (or by BBC Books under the Target Collection umbrella) unless otherwise indicated)	Audiobook	
Season	Story no.	Library no.	Novelisation title	Author	Hardcover release date	Paperback release date	Release date (Note: Unabridged from BBC Audio / AudioGo unless otherwise indicated)	Narrator
7	051	6	Doctor Who and the Auton Invasion	Terrance Dicks	17 January 1974		12 June 2008	Caroline John
7	052	9	Doctor Who and the Cave Monsters	Malcolm Hulke	17 January 1974		3 September 2007	Caroline John
7	053	121	The Ambassadors of Death	Terrance Dicks	21 May 1987	15 October 1987	4 January 2018	Geoffrey Beevers
7	054	89	Inferno	Terrance Dicks	19 July 1984	18 October 1984	7 April 2011	Caroline John

== Bibliography ==
- Smith, Paul (2014). The Classic Doctor Who DVD Compendium. United Kingdom: Wonderful Books. ISBN 978-0-9576062-2-7.
- Smith, Paul MC (July 2021). Based on the Popular BBC Television Serial. Wonderful Books.
- Howe, David J.; Stammers, Mark; Walker, Stephen James (1994). Doctor Who – The Seventies. London: Virgin Press. ISBN 1-85227-444-1..
- Bignell, Richard, ed. (2012). "Hayles Storm". Nothing at the End of the Lane. No. 3 (published January 2012)..
