= The Ambassadors of Death =

053 – The Ambassadors of Death
- Doctor Who serial

Cast
- Doctor: Jon Pertwee – Third Doctor
- Companion: Caroline John – Liz Shaw
- Others: Nicholas Courtney – Brigadier Lethbridge-Stewart; John Levene – Sergeant Benton; John Abineri – General Carrington; Ronald Allen – Ralph Cornish; Robert Cawdron – Bruno Taltalian; Cheryl Molineaux – Miss Rutherford; Robert Robertson – Collinson; Ray Armstrong – Grey; Dallas Cavell – Sir James Quinlan; Michael Wisher – John Wakefield; William Dysart – Reegan; Cyril Shaps – Lennox; Juan Moreno – Dobson; Gordon Sterne – Heldorf; John Lord – Masters; Tony Harwood – Flynn; Roy Scammell – Technician; Bernard Martin, Joanna Ross, Carl Conway – Control Room Assistants; Derek Ware – UNIT Sergeant; James Haswell – Corporal Champion; James Clayton – Private Parker; Geoffrey Beevers – Private Johnson; Max Faulkner – UNIT Soldier; Peter Halliday – Alien Voices; Peter Noel Cook – Alien Space Captain; Ric Felgate – Van Lyden/Ambassador; Steve Peters – Lefee/Ambassador; Neville Simons – Michaels/Ambassador

Production
- Directed by: Michael Ferguson
- Written by: David Whitaker; Trevor Ray (episode 1, uncredited); Malcolm Hulke (episodes 2–7, uncredited)
- Script editor: Terrance Dicks
- Produced by: Barry Letts
- Music by: Dudley Simpson
- Production code: CCC
- Series: Season 7
- Running time: 7 episodes, 25 minutes each
- First broadcast: 21 March 1970
- Last broadcast: 2 May 1970

Chronology
| ← Preceded by Doctor Who and the Silurians | Followed by → Inferno |

The Ambassadors of Death is the third serial of the seventh season of the British science fiction television series Doctor Who, which was first broadcast in seven weekly parts on BBC1 from 21 March to 2 May 1970. The serial's script was credited to David Whitaker but completed primarily by Malcolm Hulke and Trevor Ray. It was directed by Michael Ferguson.

The serial is set in London, Hertfordshire and the Earth's orbit. In the serial, the alien time traveller the Third Doctor (Jon Pertwee) and the international organisation UNIT investigate the disappearance of astronauts who have lost contact with Earth. They become involved in a conspiracy and meet alien ambassadors who have arrived on Earth.

== Plot ==
UNIT, alongside Ralph Cornish (Ronald Allen)— Professor and Controller—attempt to make contact with the missing Mars Probe Seven and its two astronauts, who lost contact with Earth eight months earlier. When the recovery crew returns to earth, it is captured by General Charles Carrington (John Abineri), also abducting the missing astronauts. Carrington is introduced to the Doctor by Sir James Quinlan (Dallas Cavell), the Minister for Technology, as head of the newly formed Space Security Department. Carrington says his actions were to protect the astronauts, as they have been infected with contagious radiation. Quinlan states the government did not want the public to become panic-stricken and reveals that Carrington has been acting with government authority. The Doctor believes the real astronauts are still in orbit, and that the three space suits contain alien beings.

An intelligent but ruthless criminal named Reegan (William Dysart) engineers the kidnapping of Liz Shaw to aid his own scientist, Lennox (Cyril Shaps), in keeping the aliens alive. Reegan sends the creatures to the Space Centre to kill Quinlan. Liz helps Lennox escape, and he tries to reach the Brigadier, but Reegan finds and kills him with a radioactive isotope.

Cornish is determined to launch another spacecraft to retrieve his astronauts from the Mars Probe capsule in Earth orbit. The Doctor volunteers to pilot the rocket himself, but it is sabotaged, and nearly kills the Doctor. In orbit, the recovery capsule is taken prisoner by an alien spaceship. Aboard the craft, an alien being explains the humans are being held pending the safe return of the alien ambassadors, who have been sent to Earth to make peaceful contact with mankind. However, the alien being also gives the ultimatum that they will attack should their ambassadors not be freed. The Doctor gives his personal guarantee to return the ambassadors safely.

When the Doctor touches down, he is kidnapped by Reegan, who reunites him with Liz. Reegan's paymaster, and the real organiser of the conspiracy, is revealed: General Carrington. In the previous Mars Probe Six mission, Carrington was one of the crew members; they discovered and made contact with these alien beings. However, the radiation emitted by the creatures is lethal to humans, which killed Carrington's partner. Out of a misplaced sense of guilt and duty, Carrington has lured the three aliens to Earth in order to expose them on television and intends to call on the nations of the world to attack them. The use of the ambassadors to kill was done simply to arouse public opinion against them beforehand.

The Doctor manages to send a radio message, and the Brigadier and UNIT soldiers rescue him and Liz, arresting Reegan. They race to the Space Centre, where the Brigadier arrests Carrington. The Doctor arranges for Ralph Cornish and Liz to return the ambassadors to their own people so that the three human astronauts can be released.

== Production ==
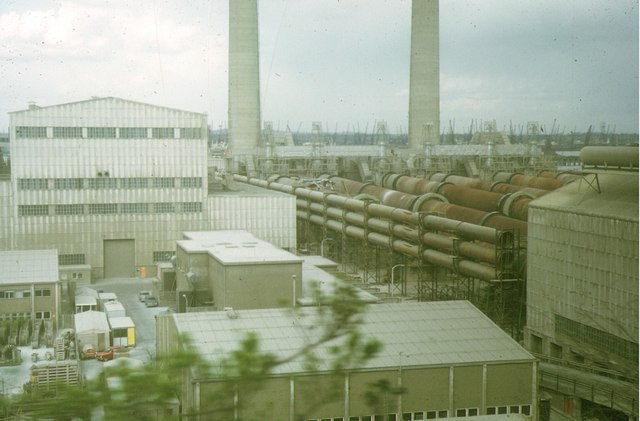
Location filming for the Space Centre took place at Northfleet Cement Works in Kent

David Whitaker, despite being the sole credited writer for the serial, drafted the first three episodes only. Trevor Ray, the series' assistant script editor, completed episode one; Malcolm Hulke finalised episodes two and three, and wrote the remaining four episodes. According to script editor Terrance Dicks, he worked under pressure to complete the scripts with Hulke in a similar process to The War Games from the previous season:

David Whitaker ... had gone through four or five drafts and you come to a stage where you write so much it just gets worse. What was happening was that the need for the script was very urgent and I stormed into [outgoing producer and script editor] Peter [Bryant] and Derrick [Sherwin] and said, "Look, we've got five drafts of this. David's fed up with it, he doesn't know what to do. What we need to do is pay David in full and Mac [Hulke] and I will finish." And that's basically what we did. I made sure that David got a full script fee for all his episodes because he had been buggered about by the establishment and Mac and I took the bare bones of his story and almost did a "War Games"—wrote new scripts very quickly—and it shows. It had its moments though.

— Terrance Dicks, script editor, interviewed by Graeme Burk and Robert Smith

Director Michael Ferguson suggested amendments to the opening titles sequence for this story. The opening titles start with the normal music and graphics, yet immediately fade after the Doctor Who title caption. There is a short "teaser" for episode one, and episodes 2–7 feature a reprise of the previous episode's cliffhanger. This is followed by the cliffhanger "sting" effect, accompanied by a zoom-in on the words "The Ambassadors", concluding with "of Death", and a "zap" effect. Ferguson also recommended the sting be used to lead into the closing credits, which was retained for future stories. Along with a closing effect, the sting was added to the theme music's recording by Brian Hodgson of the BBC Radiophonic Workshop.

Location filming took place during January and February 1970 at Blue Circle Cement in Kent, Marlow Lock in Buckinghamshire, Southall Gas Works in Middlesex, and various sites in Aldershot, Hampshire. Studio recording then took place during February and March 1970.

The astronauts’ spacesuits were created by costume designer Christine Rawlins, based on the suits used in real-life NASA space missions. The helmets were reused from the 1968 film Moon Zero Two. As the story was supposed to take place in the late 1970s, the spacesuits were designed as a futuristic version. The costumes were later reused in Colony in Space (1971) and Planet of the Daleks (1973), was well as on other BBC shows such as Monty Python’s Flying Circus. The alien underneath the spacesuit was achieved by layering the actor's face with blue make-up, tissue and latex rubber. Because it was uncomfortable for the actors, the make-up was applied shortly before they had to go on set.

Roy Scammell performed as a stunt double for Caroline John when she is pursued in Bessie and captured on the weir. Her husband, Geoffrey Beevers, briefly appears as a UNIT radio operator, credited as "Private Johnson".

=== Cast notes ===
In episodes 5 and 7, John Levene reprises the role of UNIT member Benton, now promoted to Sergeant, who had first been seen in the season 6-story The Invasion. Benton became a semi-regular character from this story onwards. Ronald Allen had appeared the previous season as one of the eponymous antagonists in The Dominators (1968). John Abineri had previously appeared in the season 5-story Fury from the Deep and later appeared in both Death to the Daleks in season 11 and The Power of Kroll in season 16. Michael Wisher appeared on screen in Terror of the Autons (1971) and Carnival of Monsters (1973), as well as being one of the regular Dalek voice artists during the Pertwee era, before becoming the first actor to play Davros in Genesis of the Daleks (1975). Geoffrey Beevers later played the Master in The Keeper of Traken (1981) and a number of Big Finish Productions audio plays. William Dysart had previously appeared in The Highlanders (1967). Peter Halliday, who provided the voices of the aliens, and also supplied the voices of the Silurians in the previous story, had first appeared in Doctor Who in The Invasion the previous season, and later appeared in Carnival of Monsters (alongside Michael Wisher), City of Death (1979) and Remembrance of the Daleks (1988). Cyril Shaps previously played Viner in The Tomb of the Cybermen (1967), and subsequently appeared with Jon Pertwee in Planet of the Spiders (1974) and with Tom Baker in The Androids of Tara (1978).

== Broadcast and reception ==
| Episode | Title | Run time | Original release date | UK viewers (millions) | Archive |
|---|---|---|---|---|---|
| 1 | "Episode 1" | 24:33 | 21 March 1970 | 7.1 | PAL 2" colour videotape |
| 2 | "Episode 2" | 24:39 | 28 March 1970 | 7.6 | Chroma dot colour recovery |
| 3 | "Episode 3" | 24:38 | 4 April 1970 | 8.0 | Chroma dot colour recovery |
| 4 | "Episode 4" | 24:37 | 11 April 1970 | 9.3 | Chroma dot colour recovery |
| 5 | "Episode 5" | 24:17 | 18 April 1970 | 7.1 | PAL D3 colour restoration |
| 6 | "Episode 6" | 24:31 | 25 April 1970 | 6.9 | PAL D3 colour restoration |
| 7 | "Episode 7" | 24:32 | 2 May 1970 | 5.4 | Chroma dot colour recovery |

Cultural historian James Chapman has written about connections between this Doctor Who serial and earlier science-fiction TV programmes. The Quatermass Experiment (1953), for example, has a similar storyline concerning astronauts endangering humanity after coming into contact with extraterrestrials. Chapman also refers to the 1960s Gerry Anderson series Captain Scarlet and the Mysterons, whose eponymous aliens are a race of malevolent Martians.

Patrick Mulkern of Radio Times noted that the script revisions caused an "uneven plot" and anticlimax, and wrote that the "narrative feels extemporised, a bumpy, sometimes thrilling ride, but one with no clear end in sight". However, he praised the cliffhangers and direction as well as the acting of Pertwee and John. The A.V. Club reviewer Christopher Bahn stated that The Ambassadors of Death was the "weakest" entry in a very good season, noting that it "spins its wheels" in the middle, but filled the time with impressive stunts. He felt that the problem was that Carrington's motivation was not revealed until the cliffhanger of the sixth episode, despite its being obvious since the first episode. Ian Berriman, reviewing the DVD release for SFX, gave the serial three out of five stars. He described it as a "hit and miss", finding the early episodes "promising" but then he felt the story did not have enough plot to carry on for seven episodes, and keeping track of the conspiracy between the various characters was "tedious and confusing". DVD Talk's John Sinnot rated The Ambassadors of Death three stars out of five, describing it as a "generally fun adventure" despite it being a couple of episodes too long. He was positive towards the Doctor's characterisation and the Ambassadors, who he described as "a great low-budget creature that actually looks more menacing than silly", but felt "there are a few too many plot twists and the result is a script with some pretty major holes in it".

== Commercial releases ==
=== In print ===
A novelisation of this serial, written by Terrance Dicks, was published by Target Books in October 1987.

=== Home media ===
Although the entire story was made on colour videotape, only the first episode was retained in this format. In fact, it is the earliest episode that survives in the series' original videotaped format, either in colour or black and white. The remaining six episodes were retained only as black-and-white film recordings and poor-quality domestic colour recordings made from a US transmission in the 1970s. This recording was severely affected by rainbow-coloured patterns of interference that at times overtook the entire picture.

In May 2002, a restoration project for the story's VHS release combined the usable colour information from the domestic recordings with the black and white picture from the film prints, creating a high-quality colour picture. All told, over half of the serial's running time was presented in colour, including all of episodes 1 and 5, and sections from 2, 3, 6 and 7. The remaining footage, including all of episode 4, was deemed unsuitable for restoration, and so remained in black-and-white.

The January 2011 edition of Wired UK magazine, published in December 2010 carried a full-page article on the recolourisation of the story. It was stated in the article that the Restoration Team expected to deliver a fully restored colour version of the story to the BBC "within weeks". In issue 430 of Doctor Who Magazine the DVD was announced but later set back due to restoration difficulties. The release was delayed until 2012 when Doctor Who Magazine issue 449 confirmed that the full-colour version would soon be out on DVD. It was later announced that the story would be released on DVD on 1 October 2012. Among the special features on the DVD is a documentary entitled Mars Probe 7: Making The Ambassadors of Death. Although David Whitaker is the sole credited writer on the actual episodes, the DVD sleeve credits The Ambassadors of Death as being written by David Whitaker, Malcolm Hulke and Trevor Ray.

The original soundtrack for this serial was released on CD in the UK in August 2009. The linking narration was provided by Caroline John.

== Critical analysis ==
A book length study of the serial, written by LM Myles, was published as part of The Black Archive series from Obverse Books in 2016.

The serial was covered in number 15 of the Doctor Who: The Complete History book series, which reprinted Andrew Pixley's Archive features from Doctor Who Magazine and the various Doctor Who Magazine Special Editions, as well as new articles created specifically for the book.
