= Simon Cain =

English-Australian actor (1938–2019)

- Born: Terence Cain; 19 May 1938; Orpington, Kent, England
- Died: 1 May 2019 (aged 80); Success, Western Australia, Australia
- Spouse(s): Patricia Binstead (stage name Patricia Kerr) (m. 1960, divorced) Lynette Green (div. 1982) (1 child)
- Children: Rachel Lee Ave Waters

Simon Cain (19 May 1938 – 1 May 2019) was an English-Australian actor, horse breeder and art gallery owner.

== Biography ==
Initially attending Banstead Residential School, Simon and his brother Barry were sent to Australia in 1950 for schooling, growing up on a farm school in Pindjarup. It was whilst living in Perth, selling televisions that Simon became interested in dramatic arts. Upon moving to Sydney, he began to appear in small parts on stage. This led to roles in TV plays and series such as Whiplash.

Returning to the UK in 1964, Cain worked at St Martin's Theatre. His further TV credits include No Hiding Place, The Rat Catchers, Doctor Who (as Curly in the James Bond-esque The Enemy of the World and then as one of the titular monsters in Doctor Who and the Silurians), Manhunt and Doomwatch plus a few films including various Carry On movies (noted below) before going back to Australia in 1972.

Continuing his career as a horse breeder, Cain worked at ranches in Western Australia, having contact with Aboriginal Australians. However, he was drawn to the United States by the preaching of evangelist Herbert W. Armstrong. First coming to Longview, Texas in 1991, he met a family in Gilmer who also bred horses. On a subsequent visit, he purchased some Australian artefacts and decided to stay in order to introduce the culture of Aboriginal art to America. This led to Cain opening Indigenous Aspirations in Gilmer, an art gallery specialising in Aboriginal Art. He moved the art gallery to Longview in 1999 and also gave lectures on the subject to students and church groups.

== Filmography ==
- Carry On Cowboy (1965) – Short
- Follow That Camel (1967) – Riff at Abdul's Tent (uncredited)
- Carry On Doctor (1967) – Tea Orderly (uncredited)
- The Blood Beast Terror (1968) – Gardener
- Carry On Up the Khyber (1968) – Bagpipes Soldier (uncredited)
- School for Sex (1969)
- The Chairman a.k.a. The Most Dangerous Man in the World (1969) – U.S. Signals Captain
- Carry On Again Doctor (1969) – X-Ray Man
- Carry On at Your Convenience (1971) – Barman
