= Doctor Who and the Silurians =

1970 British sci-fi TV serial

052 – Doctor Who and the Silurians
- Doctor Who serial
- One of the Silurians from the story

Cast
- Doctor: Jon Pertwee – Third Doctor
- Companion: Caroline John – Liz Shaw
- Others: Nicholas Courtney – Brigadier Lethbridge-Stewart; Fulton Mackay – Dr. Quinn; Peter Miles – Dr. Lawrence; Ian Cunningham – Dr. Meredith; Norman Jones – Major Baker; Thomasine Heiner – Miss Dawson; Ian Talbot – Travis; Geoffrey Palmer – Masters; John Newman – Spencer; Bill Matthews – Davis; Roy Branigan – Roberts; Gordon Richardson – Squire; Nancie Jackson – Doris Squire; Brendan Barry – Hospital Doctor; Paul Darrow – Captain Hawkins; Richard Steele – Sergeant Hart; Alan Mason – Corporal Nutting; Harry Swift – Private Robins; Derek Pollitt – Private Wright; Dave Carter – Old Silurian; Nigel Johns – Young Silurian; Pat Gorman – Silurian Scientist; Dave Carter, Pat Gorman, Paul Barton, Simon Cain, John Churchill – Silurians; Peter Halliday – Silurian Voices

Production
- Directed by: Timothy Combe
- Written by: Malcolm Hulke
- Script editor: Terrance Dicks
- Produced by: Barry Letts
- Music by: Carey Blyton
- Production code: BBB
- Series: Season 7
- Running time: 7 episodes, 25 minutes each
- First broadcast: 31 January 1970
- Last broadcast: 14 March 1970

Chronology
← Preceded by Spearhead from Space	Followed by → The Ambassadors of Death

Doctor Who and the Silurians is the second serial of the seventh season in the British science fiction television series Doctor Who. It was first broadcast in seven weekly parts on BBC1 from 31 January to 14 March 1970.

The serial is set in a research facility in the English moorland and the cave system below it, with brief segments in London. In the serial, the Third Doctor (Jon Pertwee) attempts to broker peace between humanity and the Silurians, an intelligent bipedal race of reptilians that ruled Earth before humans. This effort becomes undone by a xenophobic usurper Silurian, along with gung-ho human soldiers.

The story is the first appearance of the Silurians, after whom the Silurian hypothesis in science is named.

== Plot ==
A nuclear powered cyclotron facility in some caves under a moorland is experiencing mysterious power drains and mental breakdowns amongst staff. The Third Doctor and Liz Shaw meet Brigadier Lethbridge-Stewart there to investigate. Major Baker, the security chief, believes there is a saboteur in the centre.

The Doctor and Liz discover a Silurian base with the signal device, where they witness a Silurian being revived from hibernation by a machine, explaining the energy drains that the reactor has been experiencing.

Masters, the Permanent Under-Secretary in charge of the centre, arrives. The Doctor tells them about the Silurians in the caves, urging peaceful contact. However, this is ignored when Quinn's assistant reveals that he was killed by the Silurian he held captive. The Doctor attempts to warn the Silurians, but they put him in a cage. He is able to reason with the leader of the Silurians, who attempts to convince his brethren to find a way of co-existing with humans. The younger Silurian refuses and kills the leader, usurping the title as leader.

Baker is later infected with a deadly strain of bacteria by the Silurians before he is released, resulting in an epidemic to spread across Britain. The Doctor is able to find a cure, which is mass produced, ending the epidemic.

The Doctor, Liz and the Brigadier are then abducted by the Silurians and taken to the power plant, where the Doctor overloads the reactor and tells the younger Silurian that the area will be irradiated for at least 25 years. The Silurians re-enter the caves to hibernate until the danger has passed. Since the mechanism is faulty, the younger Silurian will stay awake to operate it and sacrifice his life. The Doctor and Liz repair the reactor. The younger Silurian realises he has been duped into sending his race back to sleep. He attacks the Doctor but is shot by the Brigadier.

The Doctor insists that the caves are to remain untouched to allow the Silurians to hibernate peacefully, hopeful that talks of peace may occur between them and humankind in the future. However, the Brigadier orders the caves to be destroyed, killing the Silurians inside and horrifying the Doctor, who opposed the mass murder of the Silurians.

== Production ==
After the previous story, producers Derrick Sherwin and Peter Bryant (who was originally to have the producer's credit on this story) were transferred to the television series Paul Temple, and the BBC intended for Barry Letts to become producer. However, Letts was committed to another production, and could not be released until after the location work on Silurians was completed. Script editor Terrance Dicks and his assistant Trevor Ray shared the production responsibilities for the location work.

The incidental music for the serial was composed by Carey Blyton, who would also contribute music for Death to the Daleks (1974) and Revenge of the Cybermen (1975).

This story is the first to be recorded using colour studio cameras. The previous serial, Spearhead from Space, was the first in colour, but was shot entirely on location (i.e., outside the electronic TV studio), and on film (as opposed to videotape, the standard method for recording Doctor Who). Due to the move to colour, the production team made use of a technique known as Colour Separation Overlay (CSO, or Chroma key), which allowed images to be superimposed over each other using colour separation. This was used extensively in the series for many years, beginning with this serial.

Location filming took place at Marylebone station in London on 12 November 1969, but after the prints were damaged, the scenes were reshot on 24 November after the rest of the serial had been finished. Other location work was undertaken in Surrey, with the heathland scenes filmed at Hankley Common.

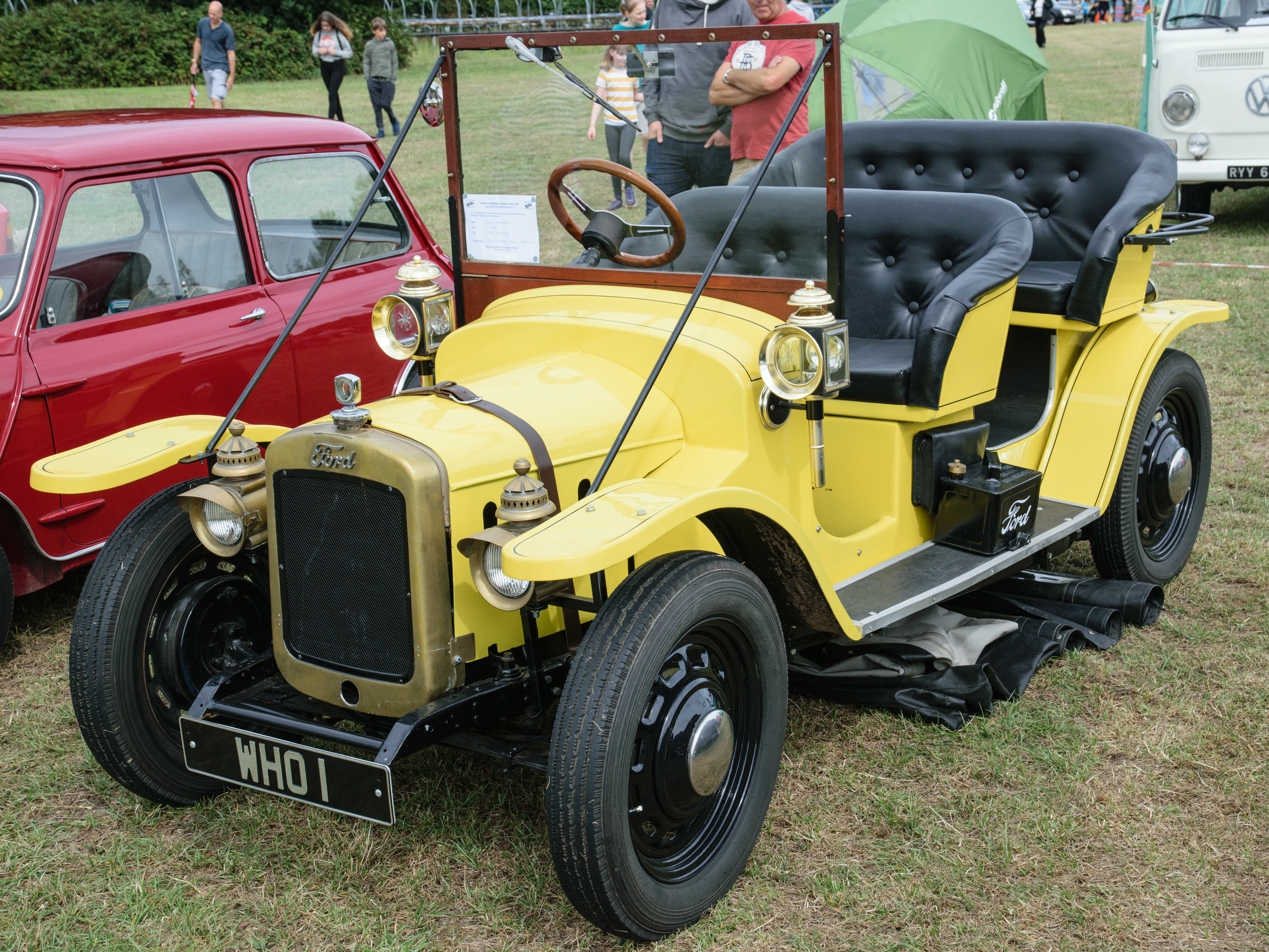
The vintage car Bessie is introduced in Episode One

Episode One marks the first appearance of the Doctor's car Bessie, a yellow Siva tourer which appeared in several later stories. In the previous serial, the Doctor had acquired a taste for vintage cars after driving a stolen vehicle, and was granted his own car by the Brigadier.

=== Alternative titles ===
This was the only time the name "Doctor Who" was used in the title of a serial on-screen (although Episode 5 of The Chase was titled "The Death of Doctor Who" on-screen and at the end of The Gunfighters, the caption read "Next Week Doctor Who and the Savages"). Although it was common in production paperwork to prefix "Doctor Who and..." to the story title at the time, the prefix was usually dropped when the director ordered the titles from the captioning department for transmission. However, this was not done for this particular story.

The reasons why this happened are not entirely clear. Director Timothy Combe states that he was presented with a story called Doctor Who and the Silurians and that it was always intended that the serial go out with that name. However, as Doctor Who historian Andrew Pixley points out, this was Combe's first serial as a full director and there was effectively no producer at this time, as noted above. In addition, the rehearsal scripts for the serial simply have The Silurians as the title. Pixley theorises that Combe was unaware of the standard production practice and gave the order to the captioning department for the "proper" title, as he believed it to be at the time.

Whatever the case, production paperwork from this point on stopped the practice of adding the prefix, perhaps as a measure to prevent the "mistake" from happening again.

=== Cast notes ===
Actor Paul Darrow would return to the series playing Tekker in Timelash (1985); he also appeared in the audio play The Next Life.

Geoffrey Palmer, who played Masters, also appears in The Mutants (1972) and in "Voyage of the Damned" (2007).

Peter Miles later played Professor Whitaker in Invasion of the Dinosaurs (1974) and Nyder in Genesis of the Daleks (1975). He also played Tragan in the radio drama The Paradise of Death and Gantman in the audio play Whispers of Terror.

Norman Jones had previously appeared as Khrisong in The Abominable Snowmen (1967) and would later play Hieronymous in The Masque of Mandragora (1976).

Ian Talbot, who played Travis in Episode Four, would later return as Klout in The Leisure Hive (1980).

Richard Steele, who plays Sergeant Hart, previously appeared as Commandant Gorton in Episode 2 of The War Games (1969) and would later appear as a guard in The Mark of the Rani (1985).

== Broadcast and reception ==
Episode	Title	Run time	Original release date	UK viewers (millions)	Archive
1	"Episode 1"	24:15	31 January 1970	8.8	PAL D3 colour restoration
2	"Episode 2"	23:08	7 February 1970	7.3	PAL D3 colour restoration
3	"Episode 3"	23:16	14 February 1970	7.5	PAL D3 colour restoration
4	"Episode 4"	25:00	21 February 1970	8.2	PAL D3 colour restoration
5	"Episode 5"	23:58	28 February 1970	7.5	PAL D3 colour restoration
6	"Episode 6"	24:15	7 March 1970	7.2	PAL D3 colour restoration
7	"Episode 7"	22:55	14 March 1970	7.5	PAL D3 colour restoration

The restored episodes were repeated on BBC2 on Tuesday evenings from 7 December 1999 to 25 January 2000, with a two-week gap between episodes three and four. Episode six was shifted to Thursday 20 January.

Mark Braxton of Radio Times wrote that the story had "quality in spades", especially in the location filming, and that the story was "gritty" and "provocative" with "fine character actors". He praised the design and the voice-acting of the Silurians but felt their rubber costume on-screen made them come across as "silly". Braxton was also disappointed with other production "shortcomings", such as the "cheap-looking" cave set, the dinosaur, and "Carey Blyton's electro-bagpiped Silurian theme". The A.V. Club reviewer Christopher Bahn wrote that it "keeps a snappy pace throughout thanks to Malcolm Hulke's well-plotted script". He noted that both the monsters and the humans were more complex than previously seen on Doctor Who. Like Braxton, he also felt the serial was "badly served by the Silurian costumes, which are terrible even by the standards of low-budget, 1970s TV". DVD Talk's John Sinnott noted that some parts were "a bit slow" due to the length, but it was a "mature" story where Pertwee defined his Doctor. However, Sinnott felt that John was still trying to find her character's place, and did not have much chemistry with Pertwee. Den of Geek gave a positive review of the serial, writing that "the production is only marred by its excessive number of episodes compared to the story it had to tell ... and an often-appalling 'medieval' score by experimentalist Carey Blyton". In 2010, Charlie Jane Anders of io9 listed Episode Six's cliffhanger as one of the best in all of Doctor Who. Anders listed the serial as a good example of the early Pertwee years, calling it "pretty fantastic" with enemies who "aren't just one-dimensional baddies" and the length "somewhat justified by a harrowing subplot where a plague starts killing people all across London".

== Commercial releases ==
=== In print ===
Doctor Who and the Cave-Monsters
- Author: Malcolm Hulke
- Cover artist: Chris Achilleos
- Series: Doctor Who book: Target novelisations
- Release number: 9
- Publisher: Target Books
- Publication date: 17 January 1974
- ISBN: 0-426-10292-4

A novelisation of this serial, written by Malcolm Hulke, was published by Target Books in January 1974 under the title Doctor Who and the Cave Monsters. In this adaptation, the Silurians were given names like Morka, Okdel and K'to. The novelisation gives extensive background to the reptile culture, including a prologue featuring their hibernation beginning. Large parts of the novelisation are told from the reptiles' point of view and there is an extensive back-story given to several characters including Quinn and Major Baker (called Barker in the novelisation). The novelisation avoids referring to the reptiles as Silurians (the word turns up as a UNIT password) but identifies the dinosaur in the caves as a tyrannosaurus rex. The novelisation was also translated into Dutch, Finnish, Japanese and Portuguese. An unabridged reading of the novelisation by actress Caroline John was released on CD in September 2007 by BBC Audiobooks.

=== Home media ===
The original 625-line PAL videotapes of the serial were wiped by the BBC for reuse, although they retained 16 mm b/w film recordings. In 1993, the colour signal from an off-air 525-line NTSC recording of all seven episodes (except for part of the beginning of episode 4) was used, along with colourisation techniques, to colourise the film prints for the VHS release in July that year.

In October 2006, the story's original soundtrack was released on CD as part of the 'Monsters on Earth' tin set, again alongside The Sea Devils and Warriors of the Deep, with linking narration from Caroline John. The CD was then individually re-issued in January 2008.

On 14 January 2008, a fresh restoration of the story was released on DVD as part of the boxed set called "Beneath the Surface", also including The Sea Devils and Warriors of the Deep. The black-and-white film prints and off-air colour recordings were again combined, now with reduced colour fringing and with the result improved with VidFIRE to approximate the 50 fields per second of the original PAL video format. The story was then released on DVD again in 2013, included in a set paired with The Hungry Earth and Cold Blood (a two-part Eleventh Doctor story from 2010), in 'The Monster Collection' series, specifically The Silurians entry.

For the 2025 Season 7 Blu-ray set a third restoration was done, this time utilising the chroma dot colour recovery process used previously on The Mind of Evil. Although the intention was to use colour recovery on all seven episodes, the first and third episodes colour signal was unusable. So for the final restoration, Episodes 1 and 3 use restored versions of the American off-air recordings for the colour source, while Episodes 2, 4, 5, 6 and 7 have the colour recovery process applied.
