= VidFIRE =

Film-to-video processing technology

VidFIRE (an abbreviation of "video field interpolation restoration effect") is a technology intended to restore the video-like motion of footage originally shot with television cameras that have been converted to formats with telerecording as their basis. The word is both a noun and a verb; in a sense, it is the opposite of filmizing, which makes video look like film.

== Background ==
Film recorded for the purposes of United Kingdom television production is usually recorded at 25 frames per second; there is an unrecorded temporal gap between each frame and the next. In contrast, video pictures are recorded as a stream of video fields. Each field can be loosely seen as half a frame, but each field is also a discrete image separated from the previous field by 1/50 second. This difference in the rate of change of the image is one of the factors contributing to the "video look", familiar to viewers as the more immediate, "live" feel seen in many soap operas and sports programmes.

When videotape technology was first created in the 1950s, tapes were extremely costly; but their reusability meant that the cost of a single tape could be spread across several productions, with each successive production erasing and then reusing the tape from a previous one, with the result that relatively few programmes produced on videotape in the 1950s and 1960s still exist in their original format.

The expense of videotape and the various mutually incompatible television standards around the world made it impractical at the time for programme makers to sell their productions to foreign broadcasters in their original video form. Film, however, was considered a universal medium, and most broadcasters had the facility to broadcast from it. Before the development of practical video tape, programme makers such as the BBC developed the technology to record programmes—either live or for prerecording—from specially adapted monitors with a film camera. The resulting film recordings are called telerecordings in the UK and kinescopes in the United States and Australia.

Programmes often were copied in this way for rebroadcast or overseas sale before the original videotapes were reused. Most live- and videotape-originated television from this era exists today only as film recordings. However, the film recording system "locks" two video fields, previously separated by 1/50 second, into a single film frame. When the film is played back, the original video-like motion is lost.

== Restoring the video look ==
VidFIRE was developed by Peter Finklestone to address the motion differences caused by the telerecording process. It uses motion estimation software to create an intermediate image, which exists temporally between two film frames. For example, if all frames of a twenty-five-minute film recording were processed, the result would be double the amount of frames and a new running length of fifty minutes. Playback at this stage (at 25 frame/s) gives smooth movement at half speed, due to the presence of interpolated images.

The programme is then further processed by interlacing adjacent frames, which halves the running time back to the original twenty-five minutes. The final result is video with fifty fields per second, alternate fields being sourced from the original film frame or the new interpolated image respectively. This has the effect of restoring the "video look" to the production.

== Limitations ==
Depending on the quality of the film stock and how carefully the film was stored and handled in the years since it was first recorded, film recordings can be very grainy, dirty and scratched. The appearance of these film artefacts on the processed programme would break the illusion that the viewer is watching a videotape recording. Therefore, to maintain the VidFIRE effect it is imperative the image be as clean and stable as possible. The best available copy of the film-recorded programme should be used, preferably the original camera negative. Before processing, the film should be cleaned, digitally noise-reduced, and repaired.

A further, self-imposed limitation is that VidFIRE is used only to process material that originally was produced using video cameras. There is no technical reason why film-originated material cannot be processed, but it is not considered to be "in the spirit" of restoration. It is also possible that the difference in lighting and picture balance on film may mean the final processed images look subjectively "wrong".

== Commercial use for Doctor Who episodes ==
The Doctor Who Restoration Team routinely VidFIREs 1960s episodes of Doctor Who when preparing them for release on DVD. The process has also been applied to a number of other programmes, including two previously lost episodes of the BBC sitcom Dad's Army, which were rediscovered in 2001. The episodes, "Operation Kilt" and "The Battle of Godfrey's Cottage," were VidFIREd in preparation for their broadcast as part of a "Dad's Army evening" on BBC Two. The remainder of series one and two of Dad's Army was later processed and released on DVD. Episodes of Sykes and Public Eye have also been treated for DVD.

A few 1960s Doctor Who episodes, all starring William Hartnell, did not undergo the VidFIRE process: Part One of The Crusade - "The Lion", and parts 1-4 of The Time Meddler were not processed because it was deemed that the damage to the films rendered the video effect unconvincing. (In the case of The Time Meddler the damage was confined to part 4 "Checkmate" but the remaining episodes were left untreated also to match on DVD.). All were finally given the process in 2022 for the Season Two Blu-ray boxset.

An easter egg included on the DVD release of The Tomb of the Cybermen featured a brief clip from that serial with VidFIRE processing applied. This was an experiment by the Doctor Who Restoration Team to see how well VidFIRE would survive the MPEG-2 encoding process. The experiment demonstrated that the VidFIRE illusion was not diminished by MPEG encoding and so the next relevant DVD release, The Aztecs, was VidFIREd in its entirety. The Tomb of The Cybermen has since been re-issued on DVD in entirely VidFIREd form as part of the Revisitations 3 box set.

A slightly revised version of the process, with an improved motion-estimation engine, was first used on the BBC's 2005 DVD release of Quatermass and the Pit (as part of The Quatermass Collection) and then on all subsequent relevant Doctor Who DVD releases.

The 1970s Doctor Who serials to have undergone the VidFIRE process are: Doctor Who and the Silurians, The Ambassadors of Death (episodes 2–7; episode 1 remains on original 2-inch tape), Inferno, Terror of the Autons, The Mind of Evil, The Claws of Axos (only episodes 2 and 3), Colony in Space, The Daemons (only episodes 1-3 and 5), The Curse of Peladon, The Sea Devils, (only episodes 1-3) The Mutants, (only episodes 1 and 2) The Time Monster, (only episodes 1-5) Planet of the Daleks (only episode 3) and Invasion of the Dinosaurs (only episode 1).

Beyond this, the technique (although critically applauded) has seen relatively little exposure, perhaps because of a belief within the broadcasting industry that public interest in the kind of archive television that would benefit from VidFIRE is insufficient to justify the cost of processing.
