= Geoffrey Beevers =

British actor (born 1941)

- Born: Geoffrey Michael Beevers; 15 January 1941 (age 85); Chichester, Sussex, England
- Occupation: Actor
- Known for: Third actor to play The Master in Doctor Who episode The Keeper of Traken (1981)
- Spouse: Caroline John (m. 1970; died 2012)
- Children: 3

Geoffrey Beevers (born 15 January 1941) is a British actor who has appeared in many stage and screen roles.

== Early life and education ==
Only son of D. Beevers, Geoffrey Beevers was educated at Tonbridge School and Wadham College, Oxford, where he read History and took a B.A. in 1962.

== Career ==
=== Theatre ===
Beevers has worked extensively at the Orange Tree Theatre in Richmond upon Thames, both as an actor (including the title role in Jules Romain's Doctor Knock, 1994); and as an adaptor/director of George Eliot's novel Adam Bede (February 1990), for which he won a Time Out Award, and Honoré de Balzac's Père Goriot (February 1994).

In 2012, Beevers appeared as Fray Antonio in the Royal Shakespeare Company production of Helen Edmundson's The Heresy of Love. In March 2013 he played opposite Helen Mirren in Peter Morgan's play The Audience at the Gielgud Theatre, and reprised the role in February 2015 at the Gerald Schoenfeld Theatre in New York City.

From October 2016 to March 2017, he played Baron Gottfried Van Swieten in a production of Amadeus by Peter Shaffer at the Royal National Theatre's Olivier Stage.

=== Television ===
Beevers played the vicar in the film Goodnight Mister Tom, and appeared in the 1978 television film The Nativity. In 1986 he played Major Hetman Jack Parham in a BBC TV adaptation of Parham's 1936 book, "Flying For Fun". In 1988 he appeared in the TV movie sequel The Great Escape II: The Untold Story, and played Wainwright (Member of Parliament) in A Very British Coup for Channel 4 Television (UK). In 1993, Beevers appeared as Inspector Montgomery in The Case-Book of Sherlock Holmes feature-length episode The Eligible Bachelor. He played several roles in the TV drama Agatha Christie's Poirot, and a small role in the 2010 remake of Clash of the Titans as a noble of Basilica. In February 2010 Beevers played Douglas Hogg in the television film On Expenses.

==== Doctor Who ====
Beevers has made two appearances in the BBC science fiction series Doctor Who, including playing the Master in the serial The Keeper of Traken, a role he has since reprised in some of Big Finish Productions' Doctor Who audio dramas (Dust Breeding, Master, Trail of the White Worm, The Oseidon Adventure, Mastermind, And You Will Obey Me, The Two Masters, The Light at the End, The Evil One, Requiem for the Rocket Men, Death Match and Masterful). Beevers narrated the unabridged audio edition of Doctor Who: Harvest of Time, by Alastair Reynolds, released in June 2013. He also read the AudioGO (and later Audible) audiobooks of Doctor Who and the Terror of the Autons, Doctor Who and the Doomsday Weapon, Doctor Who and the Sea Devils, Doctor Who and the Space War, Doctor Who and the Deadly Assassin, Doctor Who and the State of Decay, and The Ambassadors of Death.

== Personal life ==
Beevers was married to actress Caroline John, who appeared in Doctor Who as Liz Shaw, from June 1970 until her death on 5 June 2012. They had three children: daughter Daisy and sons Ben and Tom.

== Selected credits ==
=== Doctor Who related ===
- Doctor Who - Melkur/The Master/Private Johnson (1970–1981, five episodes)
- Doctor Who: The Monthly Adventures - The Master/Seta (both voices only) (2001–2016, four episodes)
- Doctor Who: Target Novelisation Audiobooks - Narrator (2007–2025, fourteen episodes)
- Doctor Who: The Fourth Doctor Adventures - The Master (voice only) (2012–2024, six episodes)
- Doctor Who: Classic Doctor Novel Readings - Narrator (2013, one episode)
- Doctor Who: The Companion Chronicles - The Master (voice only) (2013, one episode)
- Doctor Who: The Light at the End - The Master (voice only) (2013, one episode)
- Jago & Litefoot - The Master (voice only) (2015–2016, five episodes)
- Doctor Who: Audio Annuals - Narrator (2016–2025, sixteen episodes)
- Doctor Who: Short Trips - The Master (voice only) (2018, one episode)
- The Diary of a River Song - The Master (voice only) (2019, one episode)
- Doctor Who: Ravenous - The Master (voice only) (2018, three episodes)
- Masterful - The Master (voice only) (2021, one episode)
- Doctor Who Unbound - The Master/Xaonon 3 (both voices only) (2022, three episodes)
- Doctor Who: The Seventh Doctor Adventures - The Master (voice only) (2023–2024, two episodes)

=== Miscellaneous ===
- Thirteen Against Fate - 2nd man (1966, one episode)
- The Jensen Code - Doctor Verney (1973, two episodes)
- Coronation Street - Mr. Liston (1978, one episode)
- It Ain't Half Hot Mum - BBC technician (1980, one episode)
- The Hitchhiker's Guide to the Galaxy - Number Three (1981, one episode)
- Play of the Month - Telephonist/Servant (1981, two episodes)
- A Dorothy L. Sayers Mystery - Ryland Vaughan (1987, two episodes)
- The Bill - Bernard/Brian Mumford/Labour Councillor Whickham (1988–2004, four episodes)
- A Very British Coup - The Cabinet - Wainwright (1988, three episodes)
- The Ruth Rendell Mysteries - Mr. Aveney (1988, three episodes)
- Grange Hill - Mr. Birtles (1988–1989, two episodes)
- Casualty - Francis Twine/Vicar/Kemp (1992–2004, three episodes)
- Taggart - Angus Mackay (1992, three episodes)
- A Time to Dance - Christopher Pearson (1992, three episodes)
- The Buddha of Suburbia - Carl (1993, three episodes)
- Seaforth - Mr. Thursh (1994, five episodes)
- Silent Witness - Reverend Andrew Duffy (1997, two episodes)
- The Queen's Nose - Registar (1998–2000, two episodes)
- Red Dwarf - Doctor (1999, one episode)
- Boyz Unlimited - Mr. Hornchurch (1999, three episodes)
- Masterpiece - District Superintendent/Vicar (1999–2000, two episodes)
- Holby City - Terry Livsley/Peter Dunning (2008–2018, two episodes)
- Bad Education - Vicar (2013, one episode)
- EastEnders - Judge (voice only) (2016, one episode)
