= Spearhead from Space =

051 – Spearhead from Space
- Doctor Who serial
- The Autons march towards human victims and open fire.

Cast
- Doctor: Jon Pertwee – Third Doctor
- Companion: Caroline John – Liz Shaw
- Others: Nicholas Courtney – Brigadier Lethbridge-Stewart; Hugh Burden – Channing; Derek Smee – Ransome; John Woodnutt – Hibbert; Neil Wilson – Sam Seeley; Betty Bowden – Meg Seeley; Hamilton Dyce – General Scobie; John Breslin – Captain Munro; Clifford Cox – Sergeant; George Lee – Corporal Forbes; Tessa Shaw – UNIT Officer; Antony Webb – Dr. Henderson; Henry McCarthy – Dr. Beavis; Helen Dorward – Nurse; Allan Mitchell – Wagstaffe; Talfryn Thomas – Mullins; Prentis Hancock – 2nd Reporter ("Jimmy"); Ellis Jones – Technician (Note: Also provided the voice of Dr. Lomax, uncredited.); Edmund Bailey – Museum Attendant

Production
- Directed by: Derek Martinus
- Written by: Robert Holmes
- Script editor: Terrance Dicks
- Produced by: Derrick Sherwin
- Executive producer: None
- Music by: Dudley Simpson
- Production code: AAA
- Series: Season 7
- Running time: 4 episodes, 25 minutes each
- First broadcast: 3 January 1970
- Last broadcast: 24 January 1970

Chronology
← Preceded by The War Games	Followed by → Doctor Who and the Silurians

Spearhead from Space is the first serial of the seventh season in the British science fiction television series Doctor Who, which was first broadcast in four weekly parts on BBC1 from 3 to 24 January 1970. It was the first Doctor Who serial to be produced in colour and the only one to be made entirely on 16 mm film.

In the serial, which is set in Essex and London, the alien time traveller the Doctor (Jon Pertwee), now freshly regenerated and exiled to Earth by the Time Lords, joins Brigadier Lethbridge-Stewart (Nicholas Courtney) of UNIT and the scientist Liz Shaw (Caroline John) to stop the incorporeal intelligence the Nestenes from colonising the planet through their use of the Autons, killer plastic automatons which act as human duplicates and shop-window mannequins.

The serial introduced Pertwee as the Doctor and was the first to feature the Autons. It also introduces Caroline John as the Doctor's new assistant, Liz. Nicholas Courtney becomes a regular cast member beginning with this serial.

== Plot ==
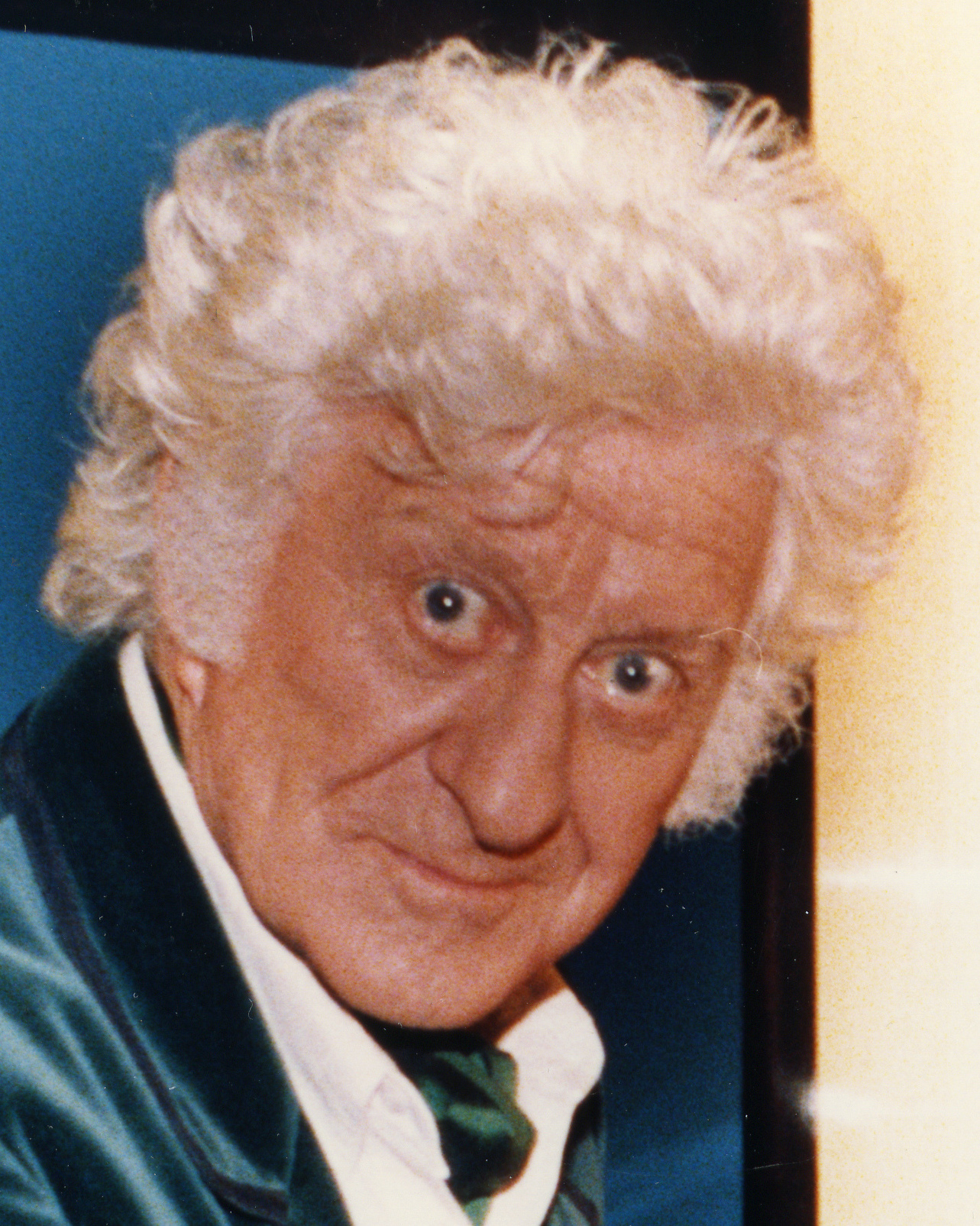
Actor Jon Pertwee makes his debut in this serial in the lead role as the Doctor

Forced into exile in 20th-century Earth by the Time Lords, the newly changed Doctor collapses outside his TARDIS and is taken to Ashbridge Cottage Hospital in Epping, where his unusual alien anatomy confuses the doctors.

Meanwhile, a meteorite shower falls on the English countryside, and a poacher discovers a mysterious plastic polyhedron at the crash site. Brigadier Lethbridge-Stewart of UNIT is trying to recruit Dr. Elizabeth "Liz" Shaw as a scientific advisor to examine any meteorites for evidence of aliens. Shaw is sceptical of the Brigadier's concerns and resents being taken away from her research at Cambridge.

The plastic polyhedron is a power unit for a non-physical alien intelligence known as the Nestene Consciousness. Normally disembodied, it has an affinity for plastic, and is able to animate human replicas made from it, called Autons. The Nestene have taken over a toy factory in Epping, and plan to replace key government and public figures with Auton duplicates. The Auton in charge of the factory sends other, less human-looking, dummy-like Autons to retrieve the power units from UNIT and the poacher.

After recovering in hospital and avoiding being kidnapped by the Autons, the Doctor discovers that the TARDIS' takeoff code has been altered by the Time Lords and he is trapped on Earth. Despite his recent change in appearance, he convinces Lethbridge-Stewart that he is the same man who helped to defeat the Yeti and the Cybermen. Together with Liz, he uncovers the Nestene plot, just as the Autons activate across Britain and begin killing. The Doctor assembles an electroshock device that he believes will disable them.

UNIT attacks the plastics factory, but the Autons are impervious to gunfire. The Doctor and Liz make their way inside and encounter a tentacled plastic host created by the Nestenes as the perfect form for the invasion. While the Doctor struggles with the creature, Liz uses the electroshock device to shut the creature down, the effect cascading to all other Autons.

The Brigadier fears the Nestenes will return and asks for the Doctor's continued help. The Doctor agrees, albeit reluctantly, to join UNIT. In return, he requires facilities to help repair the TARDIS, and a car like the sporty antique roadster he commandeered during the adventure. At his insistence, Liz also stays on as his assistant.

=== Continuity ===
The Doctor tells Brigadier Lethbridge-Stewart that his name is Doctor John Smith, an alias first used in The Wheel in Space.

== Production ==
The working title of the serial was Facsimile, and was based on a story that Robert Holmes wrote for the 1965 film Invasion, which featured an alien crashing in the woods near a rural hospital, where a medical examination reveals his alien nature. The hospital is later visited by other aliens, seeking a fugitive criminal.

Due to industrial action by staff at the BBC Television Centre, this serial was filmed almost entirely on location, to circumvent union rules. As a result, Spearhead from Space is the only classic serial shot entirely on film, as was then the standard for location filming. The majority of filming was undertaken at the BBC engineering college at Wood Norton near Evesham, and the pub in nearby Radford.

The new Doctor Who logo and title sequence

The serial introduced a new colour title sequence, created with video effects

A new logo was also created for the programme

The change to colour production also necessitated changes to the programme's opening titles. Designer Bernard Lodge, who had produced the previous sets of titles used up until Spearhead from Space, originally intended to produce a new title sequence using the same "howlaround" technique that he had for the previous titles. Tests showed, however, that the technique did not produce satisfactory results when used with colour equipment and so the final set was produced in black and white before being manually tinted. The resulting psychedelic title sequence opened with an effect of moving, concentric lozenge forms resembling flames. A still image of Jon Pertwee's face was superimposed over the pattern, before fading into a kaleidoscopic spinning spiral shape. A stutter edit was added to the opening of Delia Derbyshire's theme music. The titles were completed in August 1969, a month before work began on the serial.

The new titles also introduced a new logo for the series. Unlike the logos used for the First and Second Doctor's eras, which used a generic typeface, the new logo was a stylised adaptation of Futura typeface, with alterations to the initial "D" in "Doctor" and the "H" in "Who." This logo would be used until the final episode of The Green Death in 1973, but (in slightly modified form) would make an unexpected return in 1996 when it was adopted as the logo for the US-produced 1996 TV movie. The 1996 form subsequently became the official logo of the Eighth Doctor, and of the franchise itself, being used on original novels, video releases (1996–2003) including the alternative Ninth Doctor's animated Scream of the Shalka, DVD releases, and Big Finish Productions audio plays.

== Broadcast and reception ==
Episode	Title	Run time	Original release date	UK viewers (millions)	Archive
1	"Episode 1"	23:38	3 January 1970	8.4	16mm colour film
2	"Episode 2"	24:21	10 January 1970	8.1	16mm colour film
3	"Episode 3"	24:16	17 January 1970	8.3	16mm colour film
4	"Episode 4"	24:47	24 January 1970	8.1	16mm colour film

The story was repeated in its entirety on Friday evenings on BBC1 in July 1971, achieving ratings of 2.9, 3.0, 3.4 & 3.9 million viewers respectively. It became the first ever broadcast of Doctor Who outside of its typical Saturday evening slot. The story was later repeated on BBC2 in 1999.

In The Television Companion (1998), David J. Howe and Stephen James Walker wrote that the serial was "arguably the first to really go for the viewer's jugular with a potent combination of horror and science-fiction." They continued, "It is the terrifying and well-realised concept of killer shop dummies that makes Spearhead from Space one of the most horrific Doctor Who stories ever [...] Particularly notable is the uncompromising, adult quality of the story's realisation, which sets it apart from much of sixties Doctor Who and contributes greatly to its success." Patrick Mulkern of Radio Times awarded Spearhead from Space five stars out of five, describing it as an "extraordinary debut for the third Doctor" and also a good performance from Courtney; while positive towards John, Mulkern criticised the way Liz was "severely styled." He also commended the production, particularly Dudley Simpson's score. He wrote that "the only real disappointment is the lacklustre representation of the Nestene" and stated that the "boggle-eyed Pertwee" at the end, when he is strangled by the tentacles, "always warrants a snigger".

Christopher Bahn of The A.V. Club felt that the Autons were secondary to the serial's main goal of introducing the new cast, but commented that they "provide some effectively chilling moments". Bahn wrote that the "major flaw" was the pacing, as it spent too much time establishing "the new status quo before getting into the action". IGN's Arnold T. Blumburg rated the DVD special edition release 9 out of 10, describing the serial as "an amazing feat – a nearly complete top-to-bottom reinvigoration of the show that feels like a full-blown feature film". Den of Geek's James Peaty called Spearhead from Space "easily the best 'new Doctor' story" until Matt Smith's "The Eleventh Hour" (2010), and believed that Courtney and John were "so good [...] that you barely miss the Doctor from episode one".

Reviewing the original DVD release in 2002, DVD Talk's J. Doyle Wallis gave the serial three out of five stars, describing it as a "nice exploit" with "pretty neat villains", but criticising the little the Doctor had to do, despite it being his introduction. Ian Jane of the site was more positive when reviewing the serial for its 2012 re-release, giving it four stars. He praised Pertwee and John, as well as the suspense and pacing. Reviewing the serial for The Guardian in 2013, Phelim O'Neill wrote that "Pertwee impresses, as does his short-lived partnership with apprentice Liz" and added that "the scene of the alien-powered shop display dummies is still chilling."

In 2013, Ben Lawrence of The Daily Telegraph named Spearhead from Space as one of the top ten Doctor Who stories set in the contemporary time.

== Commercial releases ==
=== In print ===
Doctor Who and the Auton Invasion
- Author: Terrance Dicks
- Cover artist: Chris Achilleos
- Series: Doctor Who book: Target novelisations
- Release number: 6
- Publisher: Target Books
- Publication date: 17 January 1974
- ISBN: 0-426-10313-0

A novelisation of this serial, written by Terrance Dicks, was published by Target Books in January 1974, entitled Doctor Who and the Auton Invasion. This was the first novelisation commissioned by Target following the successful republishing of three books originally published in the mid-1960s. The Target Books novelisation series would run for the next twenty years and see all but six Doctor Who serials adapted. In the seventies, this book was translated into Finnish as Tohtori KUKA ja autonien hyökkäys, although Doctor Who never appeared on Finnish television until the broadcast of the 2005 revival series. There were also Dutch, Turkish, Japanese and Portuguese editions.

An unabridged reading of the novelisation by actor Caroline John was released as four CDs in June 2008 by BBC Audiobooks. The original Target books artwork by Chris Achilleos is featured on the cover.

=== Home media ===
This serial was released in an omnibus format on VHS in 1988; it was re-released in 1995 as an unedited episodic version, remaining in omnibus format for the United States, Canada, and Australia markets.

The DVD was first released in January 2001, followed by a re-release (with new outer packaging) in July 2007. There was a Special Edition DVD release in May 2011 as part of the Mannequin Mania box set, along with Terror of the Autons; it boasts additional special features and improved remastering. All four episodes have been offered for sale on iTunes.

It was re-released on DVD in 2013 as part of the Doctor Who: The Doctors Revisited 1–4 box set, together with The Aztecs, The Tomb of the Cybermen, and Pyramids of Mars. The disc presents the serial as originally broadcast, a single feature in widescreen format, introduced by former show runner Steven Moffat; it includes a documentary on the Third Doctor.

The serial was released on Blu-ray in July 2013. Due to the serial being shot entirely on film, this is the only Doctor Who story from the classic series where a complete high-definition release (with no upconversion) is feasible. Reviewing this release, Phelim O'Neill of The Guardian praised the film look of Spearhead From Space, writing, "It sounds like a small thing but it made an incredible difference; this is the only one of the vintage stories to have the picture quality worthy of a HD transfer. The Blu-ray looks superb, as if they shot a (very) low-budget Doctor Who movie late in 1969, which is pretty much what they did. The sets look sturdier, more colourful, and far better than their usual overlit, studio-bound video camerawork".

In the original broadcast of episode two, the first fifteen seconds of Fleetwood Mac's "Oh Well (Part One)" can be heard during scenes in the Auto Plastics factory. This was removed from some video and DVD releases because of copyright issues. It is present on the 1995 VHS release, the 2011 Special Edition DVD and the 2013 Blu-ray release as the track is now covered by the PPL agreement.
