= Inferno (Doctor Who) =

054 – Inferno
- Doctor Who serial

Cast
- Doctor: Jon Pertwee – Third Doctor
- Companion: Caroline John – Liz Shaw
- Others: Caroline John – Section Leader Elizabeth Shaw; Nicholas Courtney – Brigadier Lethbridge-Stewart/Brigade Leader Lethbridge-Stewart; John Levene – Sergeant Benton/Platoon Under Leader Benton; Olaf Pooley – Professor Stahlman/Director Stahlman; Christopher Benjamin – Sir Keith Gold; Sheila Dunn – Petra Williams/Dr. Petra Williams; Derek Newark – Greg Sutton; Ian Fairbairn – Bromley; Walter Randall – Harry Slocum; Derek Ware – Private Wyatt; David Simeon – Private Latimer; Roy Scammell – RSF Sentry; Keith James – Patterson; Dave Carter, Pat Gorman, Walter Henry, Philip Ryan, Peter Thompson – Primords

Production
- Directed by: Douglas Camfield; Barry Letts (episodes 3–7, uncredited)
- Written by: Don Houghton
- Script editor: Terrance Dicks
- Produced by: Barry Letts
- Music by: None (Note: This serial uses stock music composed by Delia Derbyshire, Brian Hodgson, and David Vorhaus)
- Production code: DDD
- Series: Season 7
- Running time: 7 episodes, 25 minutes each
- First broadcast: 9 May 1970
- Last broadcast: 20 June 1970

Chronology
← Preceded by The Ambassadors of Death	Followed by → Terror of the Autons

Inferno is the fourth and final serial of the seventh season of the British science fiction television series Doctor Who, which was first broadcast in seven weekly parts on BBC1 from 9 May to 20 June 1970. The serial remains the last time a Doctor Who story was transmitted in seven episodes. This serial was also the last regular appearance of Caroline John in the role of Liz Shaw.

In the serial, the alien time traveller the Third Doctor (Jon Pertwee) transports himself "sideways in time" to a parallel world, where a British drilling project causes catastrophic amounts of heat and force to be unleashed when it penetrates the Earth's crust.

== Plot ==
The Third Doctor and UNIT are called in to investigate a murder at Project Inferno, an effort to drill through the Earth's crust to harness great energies within the planet's core. It transpires that the drilling is producing a green ooze that transforms all who touch it into savage humanoid creatures called Primords, who can only be killed via extreme cold. Unbeknownst to anyone, the project leader, Professor Stahlman has been infected and is in the early stages of the change. After quarrelling with Stahlman, the Doctor attempts an experiment on the detached TARDIS console, but a freak accident transports him into a parallel space-time continuum.

In this new universe, where Great Britain is a fascist republic, the Doctor is captured and interrogated by Brigadier Lethbridge-Stewart's counterpart, a sadistic, eyepatch-wearing military commandant known as the Brigade Leader, along with the counterpart of the Doctor's companion Liz, who in this universe became a military officer instead of a scientist. When the drill penetrates the Earth's crust it unleashes immense amounts of seismic forces, heat, and poisonous gases, along with more of the ooze, which Stahlman's counterpart, now mutated, uses to transform most of the remaining project staff into Primords. The Doctor determines that the unleashed energies of the core will eventually disintegrate the planet and is able to persuade the surviving staff members to help him return to his own universe and prevent a similar catastrophe. They eventually succeed in restoring power to the TARDIS console despite Primord attacks, but Liz's counterpart is forced to kill the Brigade Leader when he turns on the Doctor, who narrowly escapes as the Project Inferno facility and Britain is destroyed by a massive volcanic eruption.

Back in his reality, the Doctor urgently tries to have the drilling stopped but as in the other reality his warnings are ignored. This time the slower pace of the drilling means that Stahlman fully transforms into a Primord before the crust is penetrated and after the Doctor kills him with a fire extinguisher, the drilling is stopped in time to prevent disaster, saving the human race. Satisfied that the TARDIS console is now working again, the Doctor attempts to depart, only to end up landing in a local rubbish dump.

== Production ==
Scriptwriter Don Houghton was a friend of the Doctor Who script editor, Terrance Dicks, they had worked together for Lew Grade at ATV in the 1960s, on the TV soap opera Crossroads. During a train journey, Houghton discussed with Dicks his idea for a serial based on the real life drilling project known as Project Mohole. Budgetary limitations eventually led to the concept of the parallel world, so that the same actors and sets could be used for seven episodes, rather than the four episodes in Houghton's original story breakdown, to limit costs.

Despite Douglas Camfield receiving sole credit as director, the studio scenes for episodes 5 to 7 were directed by producer Barry Letts, after Camfield had a minor heart attack on 27 April 1970. Letts later stated that Camfield's preparations were so meticulous, he merely followed Camfield's plans for Episodes 5 and 6, but the last episode was largely his work. Camfield remained credited as director, as BBC regulations at the time forbade Letts from being credited for more than one production role (i.e. as both producer and as director) and Letts did not want Camfield's condition to become widely known lest it harm his career.

Stuntman Derek Ware did not perform the stunt in which his character, the mutated RSF Trooper Wyatt, having been shot, falls to his death from the top of one of the chemical tanks, in case he was injured (since he was also needed for the subsequent studio recording). His place was taken by Roy Scammell, who (ironically) also played the soldier who fired the fatal shot. Ware stated in an interview that Scammell had already signed the contract to do the fall before Ware had been cast as Wyatt. At the time it was filmed, it was the highest fall ever performed by a British stuntman.

John Levene's portrayal of Benton as a Primord was inspired by Shakespeare's play Richard III (because of the Primord creature's hump).

Caroline John said she enjoyed her role as Section Leader Elizabeth Shaw, as it was fun playing Liz as a "baddie". She also said she hated doing the scenes in which she was playing her usual role, because it was boring compared to playing the parallel character. She was upset, though, about the scene in which Section-Leader Shaw shot Brigade Leader Lethbridge-Stewart, as she was pregnant at the time. As a result, the scene was recorded with the weapon fired from out-of-shot, after which Shaw was shown returning the gun to her holster. Though her pregnancy has sometimes been cited as the reason John left the show, producer Barry Letts had already made the decision not to renew her contract before learning of it.

During the scenes set on the parallel Earth, images of the British Republic's leader are seen on posters. The image used is that of BBC visual effects designer Jack Kine, in homage to the 1954 BBC adaptation of Orwell's novel Nineteen Eighty-Four in which the face of Big Brother was that of the BBC's head of television design Roy Oxley (Kine had worked on the visual effects for that production).

Episode 6 has a small damaged section on the American NTSC videotape which was used as the source of the colour signal for the restoration, which the Doctor Who Restoration Team replaced by recolouring the appropriate section of the b/w film recording.

=== Locations ===
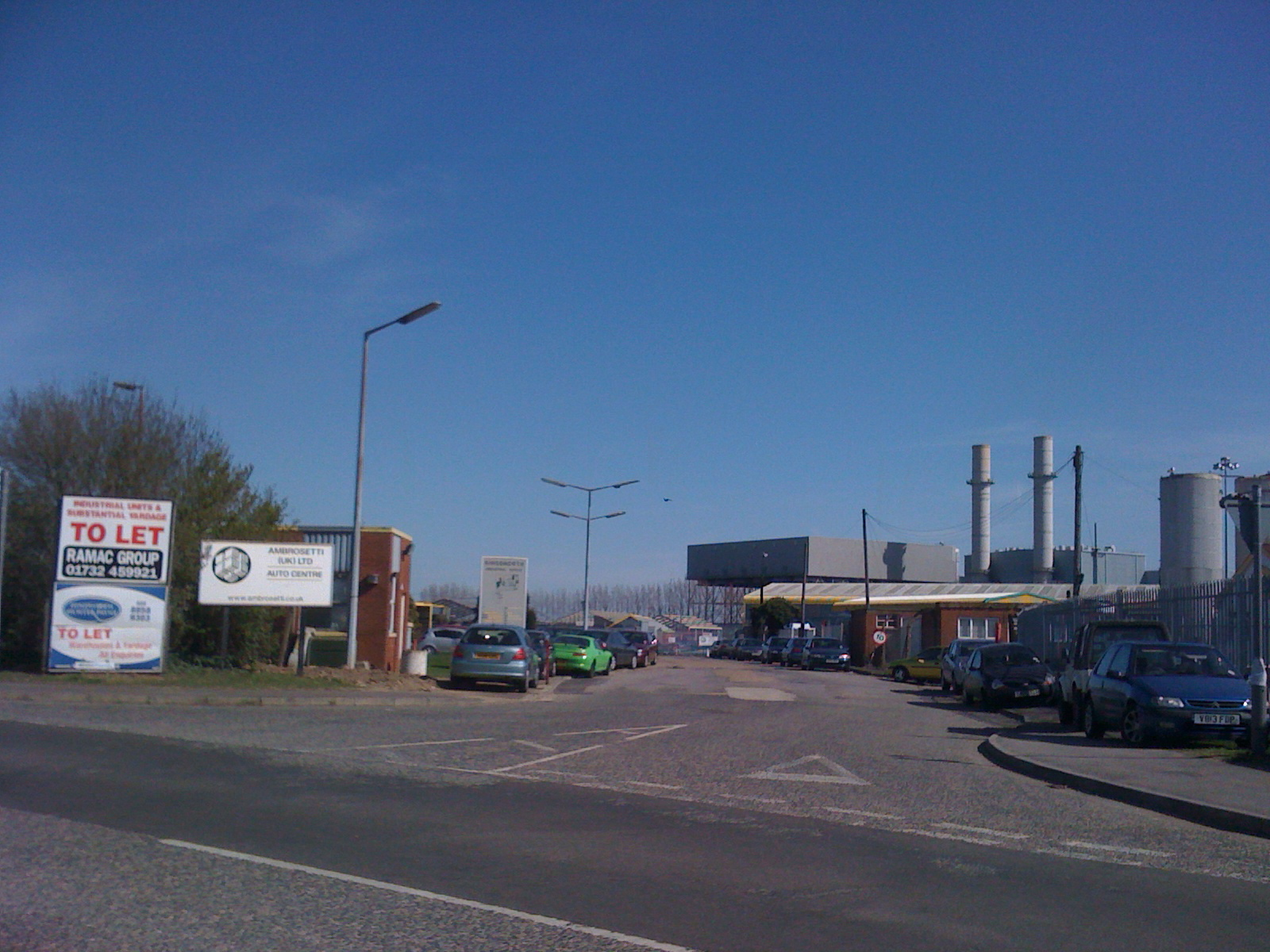
Location filming took place at Kingsnorth Industrial Estate on the Medway in Kent

The exterior shots used in this production were filmed on location at Kingsnorth Industrial Estate on the Hoo peninsula, Kent which featured as the setting for the Inferno project.

=== Music ===
Director Douglas Camfield chose not to commission new incidental music for the serial and made use of existing library recordings by members of the BBC Radiophonic Workshop. These included: "Blue Veils & Golden Sands" and "The Delian Mode" (both by Delia Derbyshire); "Battle Theme", "Homeric Theme", "Attack of the Alien Minds" and "Souls in Space" (all by Brian Hodgson); and "Build Up To" (by David Vorhaus). As was usual, Brian Hodgson supplied new sound effects for the serial, including "Tardis Control On & Warp Transfer".

According to the DVD release notes from the ITV serial Timeslip, this music subsequently featured in the second episode of that show's serial The Time Of The Ice Box.

=== Cast notes ===
Camfield cast John Levene as the scripted UNIT sergeant, allowing the character to become that of Benton, who Camfield had cast Levene as in The Invasion (1969). As a result of this decision, Benton was also included in the previous serial, The Ambassadors of Death.

Christopher Benjamin, who plays Sir Keith Gold, subsequently appeared as Henry Gordon Jago in The Talons of Weng-Chiang (1977) and as Colonel Hugh Curbishley in "The Unicorn and the Wasp" (2008). He played Tardelli in the audio play Grand Theft Cosmos. Recently, he has returned to play the character of Henry Gordon Jago in a long-running series of audio dramas titled Jago & Litefoot based upon the situation established in The Talons of Weng-Chiang.

The role of Petra Williams was given to Sheila Dunn when Kate O'Mara was unavailable to play the part. O'Mara would, years later, be cast as The Rani, a renegade Time Lord. Dunn was the wife of this story's co-director, Douglas Camfield, and had appeared twice before in Doctor Who, in The Invasion (1968) and The Daleks' Master Plan (1965–66).

Ian Fairbairn (Bromley) had previously appeared as Questa in The Macra Terror (1967) and as Gregory in The Invasion, and later was Doctor Chester in The Seeds of Doom (1976).

Derek Newark (Greg Sutton) had played Za in the first ever Doctor Who serial, An Unearthly Child, in 1963.

Stuntman Alan Chuntz received a bad leg injury in episode 3 when he was hit by the car Jon Pertwee was driving. Pertwee felt so bad about it that he became ill himself, which threatened to disrupt filming.

== Broadcast and reception ==
Episode	Title	Run time	Original release date	UK viewers (millions)	Archive
1	"Episode 1"	23:21	9 May 1970	5.7	RSC converted (NTSC-to-PAL)
2	"Episode 2"	22:04	16 May 1970	5.9	RSC converted (NTSC-to-PAL)
3	"Episode 3"	24:34	23 May 1970	4.8	RSC converted (NTSC-to-PAL)
4	"Episode 4"	24:57	30 May 1970	6.0	RSC converted (NTSC-to-PAL)
5	"Episode 5"	23:42	6 June 1970	5.4	RSC converted (NTSC-to-PAL)
6	"Episode 6"	23:32	13 June 1970	5.7	RSC converted (NTSC-to-PAL)
7	"Episode 7"	24:33	20 June 1970	5.5	RSC converted (NTSC-to-PAL)

In 2009, Mark Braxton of Radio Times awarded the serial five stars out of five and praised the intense atmosphere, with a "good, scary, cautionary" plot. However, he noted that the Primords were not the best physical design and their relationship to the events was not cleared up. Reviewing the special edition DVD release, Dave Golder of SFX gave the serial four out of five stars. He wrote that the alternate universe plot that was (mistakenly cited as being) added to stretch out the story was "the best thing about it" and the actual plot felt "a little B-movie in comparison, but ... remains a stylish and action-packed slice of Pertwee Who". DVD Talk's Ian Jane rated Inferno three and a half out of five stars, praising the cast and "decent" production values. Jane noted that the story had a slow beginning, but once the pace picked up it became "choice entertainment". In 2008, The Daily Telegraph named Inferno as one of the ten best Doctor Who episodes ever. It did so again in 2023. Charlie Jane Anders of io9 listed the cliffhanger of the sixth episode as one of Doctor Who's greatest cliffhangers in a 2010 article. Den of Geek listed the serial as an example of good sound design and music score.

This serial was judged by a 2009 Doctor Who Magazine fan poll to be the finest story of the Third Doctor's era and 31st in the series overall (out of 200 stories total). A similar poll taken in 2014 ranked Inferno as the 18th-greatest story of all time.

== Commercial releases ==
=== In print ===
A novelisation of this serial, written by Terrance Dicks, was published by Target Books in June 1984.

=== Home media ===
Inferno
- Author: Terrance Dicks
- Cover artist: Nick Spender
- Series: Doctor Who book: Target novelisations
- Release number: 89
- Publisher: Target Books
- Publication date: 18 October 1984
- ISBN: 0-426-19617-1

The original 625-line PAL videotapes were wiped for reuse in the mid 1970s. BBC Enterprises retained the black-and-white film recordings made for overseas sales to countries not yet broadcasting in colour. In 1985, a set of broadcast quality 525-line NTSC colour videotapes were returned from Canada. Due to the complexities of conversion, the original re-conversions back to 625-line PAL left the picture looking a little blurred and faded when the story was released on VHS in the UK in May 1994. Before this, Episode 7 of the story had been included on the 1992 VHS release The Pertwee Years, along with the final episodes of both The Dæmons and Frontier in Space. When Inferno was released on Region 2 DVD on 19 June 2006, however, the picture quality had been markedly enhanced through the use of the "Reverse Standards Conversion" procedure. This serial was also released as part of the Doctor Who DVD Files in Issue 44 on 8 September 2010.

A special-edition re-release of the story was released on 27 May 2013. This uses the same technique employed on the special-edition DVD of The Claws of Axos: the colour information from the Reverse Standards Conversion video was combined with luminance information from a geometrically-corrected remaster of the 16mm b/w film recording, with VidFIRE applied to the studio interior scenes to recreate the 50-field interlaced look. The resulting picture is sharper than the RSC version.

The Canadian videotapes include an additional scene in Episode 5 that was not originally transmitted in the UK, but was retained for overseas screening; and has also appeared on both the UK Gold transmissions and BBC Video's VHS release. Set in the Brigade Leader's office, the scene sees the Doctor, the Brigade Leader and Section Leader Shaw listening to a BBC radio news report voiced by Jon Pertwee, who imitates the style of William Joyce, the scene was cut before transmission because it was felt Pertwee's voice was still too identifiable. The radio announcer names the area where the Inferno project is taking place as Eastchester; the name is not mentioned anywhere else in the story, but is subsequently mentioned in spin-off media. The scene was included as an extra on the DVD releases, with the episode itself presented exactly as originally transmitted (using the 16 mm b/w film recording for reference when editing).
