= Liz Shaw =

Fictional character from Doctor Who

- Doctor Who character
- Shaw in Spearhead from Space (1970)
- First appearance: Spearhead from Space (1970)
- Last appearance: "The Five Doctors" (1983)
- Portrayed by: Caroline John (1970–1996); Hazel Burrows (2015)
- Shared universe appearances: P.R.O.B.E. (1994–1996, 2015)
- Non-canonical appearances: Dimensions in Time (1993)
- Duration: 1970, 1983, 1993, 1994–1996, 2015

In-universe information
- Full name: Elizabeth Shaw
- Nickname: Liz
- Species: Human
- Occupation: Scientist
- Affiliation: Third Doctor; UNIT; P.R.O.B.E.
- Family: Emily Shaw (mother)
- Origin: Stoke-on-Trent, Staffordshire, England
- Home: Earth
- Home era: 20th and 21st centuries

Elizabeth Shaw is a fictional character played by Caroline John in the long-running British science fiction television series Doctor Who and its spin-offs. A civilian member of UNIT, an international organisation that defends Earth from alien threats, she was the companion of the Third Doctor for the 1970 season. Although commonly referred to as "Miss Shaw," Liz says that she is, in fact, a medical doctor in the seventh and final episode of Inferno, which was her last appearance. In total, Liz appeared in four stories (25 episodes).

== Appearances ==
=== Television ===
Liz Shaw first appears in the first serial of the seventh season (1970), Spearhead from Space, having been drafted from the University of Cambridge by Brigadier Lethbridge-Stewart as a scientific advisor to UNIT. She is a brilliant scientist, an expert on meteorites, with degrees in medicine, physics and a dozen other subjects. Her extensive training is still pale in comparison to the Doctor's own knowledge of the universe and scientific principles far beyond those of Earth. Sceptical at first of UNIT's ambit to defend against alien invasion, Shaw changes her mind when she encounters the newly regenerated Doctor and becomes involved in defeating the plans of the Nestene Consciousness and its animated plastic Autons.

Liz continues to work with the Doctor and UNIT through encounters with the Silurians, the so-called Ambassadors of Death and the Inferno project, where the Doctor also encountered Section Leader Elizabeth Shaw, an alternative version of the scientist in a parallel universe. She eventually resigns from UNIT and returns to Cambridge; there was no "farewell scene" on screen for Liz, with her departure simply being announced by the Brigadier at the beginning of Terror of the Autons. She reportedly told the Brigadier that all the Doctor really needed was someone to pass him his test tubes and tell him how brilliant he was.

Liz's life after leaving UNIT is not explored in the series. In the Seventh Doctor serial Battlefield (1989), the Doctor gives Ace a fake ID with the name Elizabeth Shaw. Additionally, in the 2010 The Sarah Jane Adventures story Death of the Doctor Colonel Tia Karim mentions that "Miss Shaw can't get back from Moonbase until Sunday." Caroline John appeared as an illusory image of Liz in the 20th Anniversary television movie "The Five Doctors" (1983), and as Liz herself in the 1993 charity special Dimensions in Time.

=== Other media ===
John also played Liz Shaw in a series of straight-to-video stories produced by BBV under the umbrella title of P.R.O.B.E., in which the character works with a paranormal investigation organisation not unlike UNIT, called the "Preternatural Research Bureau". John later returned as Liz appearing in five Big Finish audio stories narrated by the character: The Blue Tooth (2007), Shadow of the Past (2010), The Sentinels of the New Dawn (2011), Binary (2012), and The Last Post (2012). The latter introduces Rowana Cooper as Liz's mother, Emily, and the planned sequel was not finished due to John's death in June 2012, although Cooper reappears as Emily Shaw in the audio "The Cloisters of Terror" when she assists the Fourth Doctor and Leela in investigating a mystery at her college.

Caroline John's daughter Daisy reprises her mother's role as Liz in The Third Doctor Adventures- Volume Five: Primord, where Liz is infected by samples of Stahlman's gas and psychologically corrupted to try and infect all of humanity with the gas, nearly infecting the Doctor until he is able to pass on instructions to the Brigadier and Jo about how they might be able to help him resist the mutation long enough to find a cure. Daisy reprises the role again in Series 9 of The Diary of River Song, where Liz is put out to be relegated to assistant to UNIT's new temporary scientific advisor, River Song- the Doctor's future wife- while the Doctor is otherwise engaged.

The 1996 Virgin Missing Adventures novel The Scales of Injustice by Gary Russell also explores the events surrounding Liz's resignation from UNIT. Liz additionally appears with UNIT in the Missing Adventures novel The Eye of the Giant (1996) and the Past Doctor Adventures novel The Devil Goblins from Neptune (1997). Scales of Injustice directly acknowledges that Liz left UNIT because she felt surplus to requirements with the Doctor around and wanted to focus more on scientific research, the Doctor assuring her that he understood her reasons and regretted that they hadn't been able to spend more time together as friends. Liz eventually does travel in the TARDIS with the Third Doctor and Jo Grant in the Past Doctor Adventures novel The Wages of Sin (1999), which takes place after the Doctor regains his freedom, with the Doctor's attempt to take her to witness the Tunguska Event accidentally resulting in them becoming caught up in the truth about the death of Grigori Rasputin. A parallel version of her appears in the novel Blood Heat where she is still part of UNIT fighting against the Silurians in a world where the Doctor died before defeating the reptiles. According to the 1997 Virgin New Adventures novel Eternity Weeps by Jim Mortimore, Liz dies in 2003, the victim of an extraterrestrial terraforming virus contracted while she was part of a UNIT team investigating an alien artefact on the Moon, despite the efforts of the Seventh Doctor and his current companion Chris Cwej to save her.

== Casting and characterisation ==
The part of Liz Shaw was given to Caroline John, who was recommended to the outgoing production team of Peter Bryant and Derrick Sherwin by James Cellan Jones. Although John had been working regularly on the stage (including for the National Theatre Company under Laurence Olivier), she was frustrated that she had not gained any TV roles. According to several DVD releases in the Doctor Who series and interviews with the actress herself, John had taken the dramatic step of having herself photographed in a bikini and sent the picture around to BBC producers. The photo ended up on Bryant's desk.

After appearing in the 25 episodes that made up the four stories of the seventh season, John left the programme because she was pregnant with her first child, and new producer Barry Letts had already decided against renewing her contract. Letts and script editor Terrance Dicks viewed the character as unsuccessful, feeling that she did not fill the companion's role of asking the Doctor for exposition and acting as an audience surrogate. In 1978, John expressed mixed feelings about her role as Liz, saying, "I was excited at first to be a brainy girl, but all the directors wanted really was a sexy piece. It was such an effort looking glamorous on cold clay-pits and rubbish dumps. I enjoyed the series but found it restricting after a while." John continued to appear at fan conventions from the 1990s onwards.

John particularly enjoyed her role as the "totalitarian" version of Liz seen in the alternate universe in Inferno, disliking when she had to change to the normal Liz. Liz has been seen as more of an assistant than a traditional companion because she never travelled on the TARDIS. Unlike other "co-conspirator" companions, Liz serves as a bridge between the Doctor's world and the more grounded UNIT. She has also been described as more mature and equal to the Doctor than previous companions. Following John's death in 2012, then Doctor Who showrunner Steven Moffat described Liz as "not just a sidekick but a scientist in her own right" and an example of his sentiment that "the Doctor's companions should never be his assistants – they're the people who keep him on his toes".

== Reception ==
Christopher Bahn of The A.V. Club described Liz as a "missed opportunity" because she had such a short time as an assistant and it seemed to him that "the producers didn't really know what to do with a strong, smart female character". Bahn also commented that Liz's "cynicism and skepticism was a good quality for a scientist, but also a sometimes offputting character tic". In an analysis of Doctor Who and the Silurians for Doctor Who: The Television Companion, David J. Howe and Stephen James Walker were positive towards Liz, who they said was "very good foil, far removed from the naïve young companions of the past".

Radio Times writer Mark Braxton wrote that, despite her short appearance, "Liz established herself thanks to her brilliant mind, a succession of crazy outfits and Caroline John's consummate professionalism as an actress". Braxton also felt that "she was too caring to be cold" and despite not having the "companionly affection" later seen with Jo Grant and Sarah Jane Smith, they had an "innate respect" for each other. Braxton's colleague Patrick Mulkern, while calling John a "gifted actress", criticised the way Liz was "severely styled" in her first appearance. SFX's Ian Berriman also criticised Liz in Spearhead from Space, writing that she was "so snarky she's annoying". Will Salmon of the magazine listed Liz's departure as one of the worst in the series since she just "[vanished] between seasons". DVD Talk's John Sinnott felt that John could come across as "a bit stiff" and did not have much chemistry with Pertwee, most likely due to their personal relationship.

In 2010, readers of Radio Times voted Liz the 27th best companion, out of 48 options. In Ridley Scott's 2012 film Prometheus, Noomi Rapace's character is named Dr. Elizabeth Shaw; Dr. Nicolas Pillai, a lecturer from the University of Warwick's Film and Television Studies department, argues that this is a reference to the Doctor Who character, as Scott used to work for the BBC as a designer. However, this is entirely speculation and neither Scott nor the scriptwriters of Prometheus have ever officially stated the name was intentionally used as such.
