= Timothy Combe =

British retired director and agent (born 1936)

- Born: 17 October 1936 (age 89)
- Occupation: Director • agent

Timothy Combe (born 17 October 1936) is a British retired television director and actor's agent. As a director of BBC television drama from the late 1960s to the late 1970s, he worked on series such as Doctor Who, Z-Cars and The Brothers, as well as classic serials and plays.

== Career ==
Combe attended the Webber Douglas Academy of Dramatic Art in London, where he won the Shakespeare Cup and Margaret Rutherford Medal. He then joined the BBC in 1962 as an assistant floor manager. He was promoted to become a director in 1968. He directed Z-Cars, the popular and long-running police drama series, becoming one of the most prolific directors of the series. He also directed two serials in the long-running science fiction series Doctor Who when it starred Jon Pertwee. Although highly regarded as a director by the series' then producer, Barry Letts, he went over-budget on the second and was not asked to do more as a result. Two classic serials, The Early Life of Stephen Hind and Ballet Shoes followed, the latter winning Emmy and BAFTA awards. He was then invited to direct Angela Huth's first TV play, The Summer House, and Richard Harris's When The Boys Come Out To Play. After directing episodes of the sixth and seventh series of The Brothers from 1976, he was asked to act as the BBC producer on Golden Soak, filmed in Australia and one of the first co-productions undertaken by the BBC. After directing Angels, he helped set up the BBC's first venture into video cassette production (VHS).

In 1980, he gave up directing in order to become an actor's agent. He later lectured at the Guildford School of Acting for five years, helping graduating students prepare for entry into the business.

== Filmography ==
- The Newcomers (1968–69)
- Doctor Who and the Silurians (BBC, 1970)
- Doctor Who: The Mind of Evil (BBC, 1971)
- The Doctors (BBC, 1970/71)
- Away from it All (BBC, 1973)
- Z-Cars (BBC, 1968-1973)
- Sporting Scenes (BBC, 1973)
- The Early Life of Stephen Hind (BBC Classic Serial 1974)
- Ballet Shoes (BBC TV Serial 1975). Emmy & BAFTA Awards
- The Brothers (BBC, 1976)
- Rupert Christmas Adventure. Westminster Theatre. 1977
- Golden Soak. Producer. (six-part series filmed in Australia)
- Angels (BBC, 1976)
