= Caroline John =

English actress (1940–2012)

- John as Liz Shaw in the Doctor Who serial Spearhead from Space (1970)
- Born: Caroline Frances John; 19 September 1940; York, England
- Died: 5 June 2012 (aged 71); London, England
- Education: Royal Central School of Speech and Drama
- Occupation: Actress
- Years active: 1954–2012
- Television: Doctor Who; A Perfect Spy
- Spouse: Geoffrey Beevers (m. 1970)
- Children: 3

Caroline Frances John (19 September 1940 – 5 June 2012) was an English actress. She played classical roles on the stage as well as several television roles. She is best known for playing Elizabeth "Liz" Shaw in the BBC science fiction television series Doctor Who.

== Early life and education ==
John was the third of eight children born to Vera (née Winckworth), an actress and singer, and Alexander John, a theatre director. She was educated at St. Joseph's Convent School, Crackley Hall in Kenilworth.

After training at the Central School of Speech and Drama, she worked in theatre and toured with the Royal Shakespeare Company and the National Theatre Company. She appeared in Juno and the Paycock in a 1966 production directed by Laurence Olivier, King Lear, Rosencrantz and Guildenstern are Dead, and The Merchant of Venice.

John also appeared as Hero in Franco Zeffirelli's 1965 National Theatre production of Much Ado About Nothing. This production was adapted for television and shown on BBC1 in February 1967. It was subsequently lost from the BBC archives, but in 2010 it was announced that a copy of it had been discovered in the US Library of Congress as part of a substantial tranche of missing British TV. An extract including John was released by the BBC in 2016, with the play reaired in its entirety for the first time on 28 December 2024.

== Doctor Who ==
John played the role of the Doctor's companion in 1970 opposite Jon Pertwee's Third Doctor. John was recommended to then Doctor Who producer Peter Bryant by another BBC producer, James Cellan Jones, who sent Bryant and his associate Derrick Sherwin photographs of her.

Unlike most of the preceding and subsequent female companions of the Doctor, Shaw was a brilliant scientist and understood much of the Doctor's technobabble. Shaw and the Doctor discussed things on a more equitable level of intelligence, and the Doctor respected and rarely patronised her.

During her final story, Inferno, John also played the part of Section Leader Elizabeth Shaw, an alter ego of her regular character that the Doctor encounters in an alternative time stream. John reprised the role of Shaw, albeit as a phantom, in the anniversary episode "The Five Doctors", and also appeared in the special episode Dimensions in Time (1993), part of the BBC's annual Children in Need appeal. In the 1990s she appeared in a series of straight-to-video releases including The Stranger: Breach of the Peace, and as Liz Shaw in the P.R.O.B.E. stories written by Mark Gatiss and featuring numerous actors from the history of Doctor Who – including Jon Pertwee, Peter Davison, Colin Baker and Sylvester McCoy. In these stories made by the production company BBV, a pipe-smoking Shaw works as an investigator (for the P.R.O.B.E. organisation); John is seen opposite Linda Lusardi in the former model's first acting role.

John later appeared in two Big Finish Productions' audio dramas based on Doctor Who; Dust Breeding (2001), although playing a character other than Liz Shaw, and The Blue Tooth (2007) where, as Liz, she recounts in narrative form an adventure she once had with the Doctor and UNIT. After The Blue Tooth she played Liz in four more Companion Chronicle audio plays; Binary, The Sentinels of the New Dawn and Shadow of the Past. Her final audio play, The Last Post, which she recorded on 26 January 2012, was released after her death.

== Other performances ==
After leaving Doctor Who and the birth of her first child, John appeared in the BBC drama series The Doctors playing the recurring role of Marilyn Lane for four episodes in 1971. In 1972, she appeared in the one-off BBC1 drama for the Omnibus strand, Actor, I said starring Barry Foster and Martin Jarvis, just a few weeks before appearing in the Z-Cars episode Operation Ascalon. For the next several years, John became a regular performer in BBC Radio dramas, which included appearances in Radio 4 series Afternoon Theatre, Five Morning Plays, The Monday Play, Saturday Night Theatre, Story Time and being a regular story teller on Woman's Hour. Various BBC radio productions covered in these strands were Thérèse with Vivien Merchant, Jane Eyre with Patrick Allen, How To Get Away With Murder, The Concert, New Grub Street with Robert Powell, Observations on a Jesting Man, Mr. Campion's Falcon, An Infinity of Changes and Jane Austen's Lady Susan amongst many others. John played the role of Laura Lyons in the BBC adaptation of the Sherlock Holmes story The Hound of the Baskervilles, opposite Tom Baker. The four part adventure was produced by Barry Letts. She returned to radio for Radio 3's Light in Distant Rooms.

In 1987, John appeared in the BBC2 drama series A Dorothy L. Sayers Mystery: Gaudy Night as Miss Burrows. She also appeared in the BBC's adaptation of John le Carré's A Perfect Spy as Dorothy Pym. Throughout January 1988, John and her husband Geoffrey Beevers appeared in BBC Radio 4's Poetry Please. John and Beevers appeared together in an episode of Agatha Christie's Poirot titled "Problem at Sea" as Mr and Mrs Tolliver. They both had roles in the audio play Dust Breeding and the TV adaptation of the political thriller A Very British Coup, although they did not appear on screen together. John appeared in several episodes of Casualty as recurring character Edith Hewlett. In 1995, she appeared as Janet Young in the BBC drama adaptation of Joanna Trollope's The Choir. Other minor TV appearances included EastEnders, It Might Be You, Silent Witness and Dangerfield. John also appeared in a non-speaking, background role in the film Love Actually.

Her career in the theatre included appearances in His Majesty (1992), Silas Marner (1998), The Master Builder (1999), Death of a Salesman (2001), Happy Birthday Dear Alice (2002), and Dona Rosita (2004).

== Personal life and family ==
In June 1970, John married actor Geoffrey Beevers, who later appeared in Doctor Who as the Master, in The Keeper of Traken (1981). The couple had three children: a daughter, Daisy Ashford, and sons Ben and Tom. Ashford, also an actress, has portrayed her mother's Doctor Who character, Liz Shaw, in audio dramas for Big Finish Production.

John died on 5 June 2012 from cancer.

== Credits ==
=== Film and television ===
Year	Title	Role	Notes
1955	Raising a Riot	Schoolgirl	Uncredited
1970	Doctor Who	Liz Shaw	25 episodes
1971	The Doctors	Marilyn Lane	4 episodes
1972	Omnibus	Jenny	Episode: "Actor, I Said"
1972	Z-Cars	Mrs. Drummond	Episode: "Operation Ascalon"
1973	Assassin	Ann	
1975	Going To Work		
1982	The Hound of the Baskervilles	Laura Lyons	2 episodes
1983	Doctor Who: The Five Doctors	Liz Shaw	20th Anniversary special
1984	Goodbye Days	Joan's Mother	TV movie
1984	The Razor's Edge	Mrs MacKenzie	
1985	Santa Claus: The Movie	Woman	Uncredited
1985	British Social History Nine Days		
1986	Link	Mrs. Miller	Uncredited
1987	A Dorothy L. Sayers Mystery: Gaudy Night	Miss Burrows	3 episodes
1987	A Perfect Spy	Dorothy Pym	1 episode
1988	Casualty	Edith Hewlett	2 Episodes
1989	The Woman in Black	Stella's Mother	TV movie
1992	Moon and Son	Mrs. Thorpe	Episode: "GI Joe Is Missing"
1993	Doctor Who: Dimensions in Time	Liz Shaw	Charity special
1994	Against All Odds	Caroline Cook	
1994	Breach of the Peace	DCI Diana Sellars	
1994	The Zero Imperative	Liz Shaw	
1995	The Devil of Winterborne	Liz Shaw	
1995	The Choir	Janet Young	3 episodes
1995	EastEnders	Judge	1 episode
1995	It Might Be You	Barrister's Wife	TV movie
1996	Silent Witness – Darkness Visible	Mrs. Claire	1 episode
1996	Dangerfield	Coroner	Episode: "Inside Out"
1996	Unnatural Selection	Liz Shaw	
1996	Ghosts of Winterborne	Liz Shaw	
1997	The Woodlanders	Housekeeper	
2003	Love Actually	Sam's Grandmother	
2008	Doctors	Susan Milnes	Episode: "Mummy Dearest" (final appearance)

=== Tributes ===
Year	Title	Network	Notes	Air Date
2012	Review 2012: We Remember	BBC News	Archive footage	27 December 2012
