= Silurian and Sea Devil =

Fictional race from the television series Doctor Who

- Doctor Who race
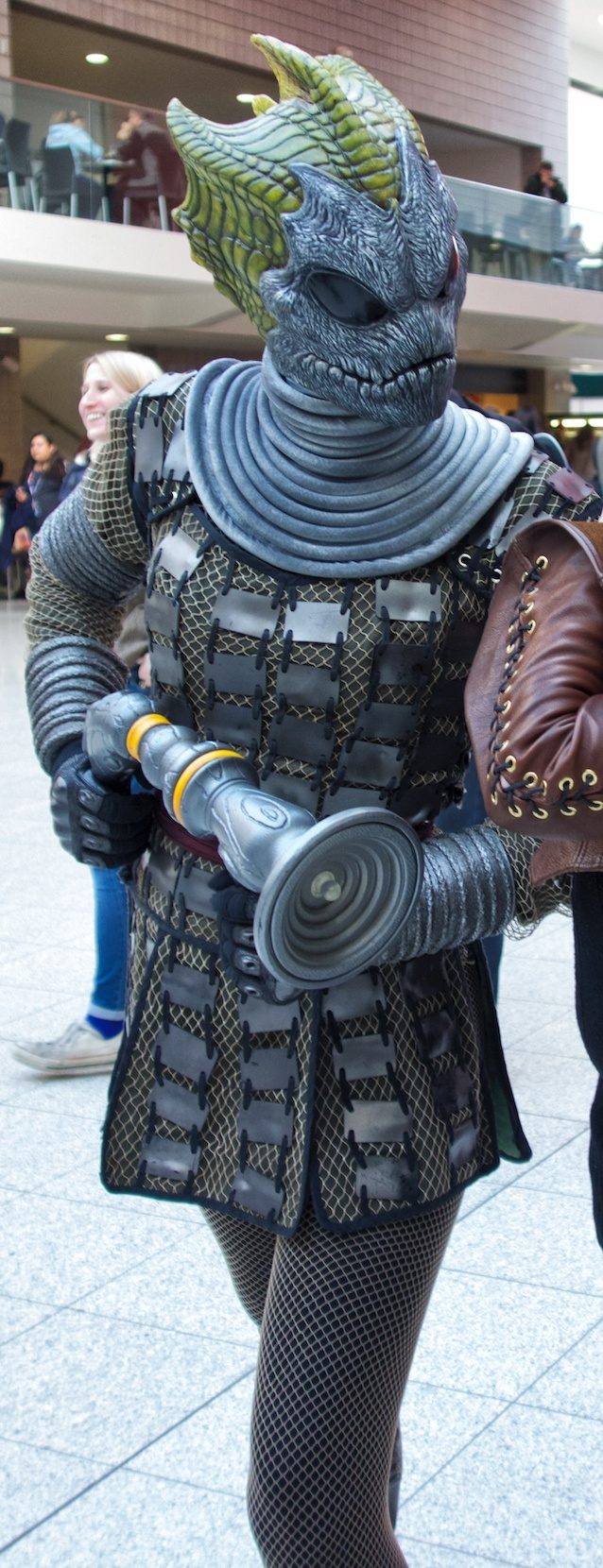
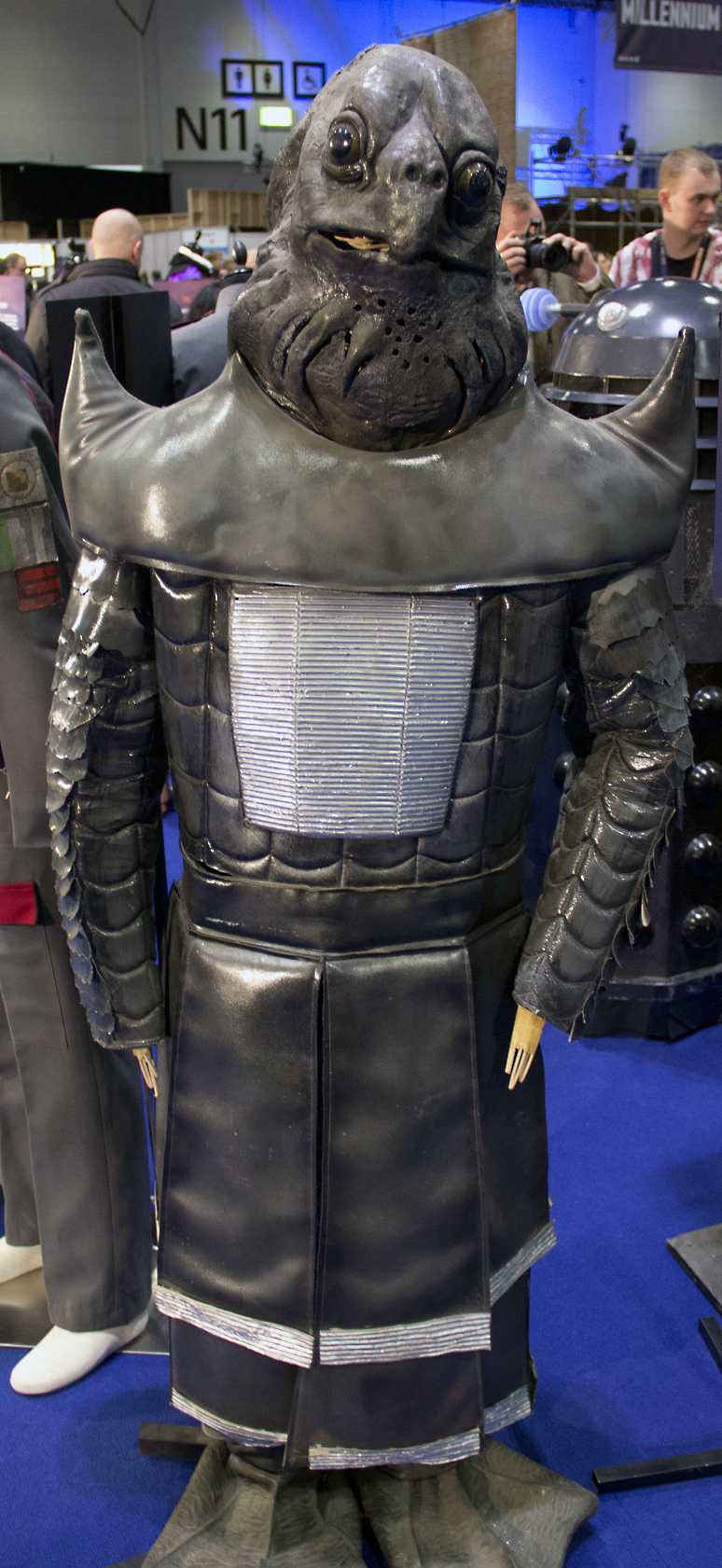
- The 2010 redesign of the Silurians (left) and a 1984 Sea Devil (right) as seen at a Doctor Who exhibition
- First appearance: Doctor Who and the Silurians (1970) (Silurians); The Sea Devils (1972) (Sea Devils)
- Created by: Malcolm Hulke

In-universe information
- Home world: Earth
- Type: Reptilian humanoids; Amphibian humanoids (Sea Devils)

The Silurians and Sea Devils are two fictional related ancient species created by Malcolm Hulke for the British science fiction television series Doctor Who. The Silurians are a race of scientifically advanced reptilian humanoids from the dawn of man which first appeared in Doctor Who in Hulke's 1970 serial Doctor Who and the Silurians. The Sea Devils are similar to the Silurians, but hail from the oceans and are aquatic, having debuted in the serial The Sea Devils (1972). Both species then reappeared in the 1984 serial Warriors of the Deep, which was the final appearance of both races prior to the show's cancellation in 1989. Following the show's revival in 2005, heavily redesigned Silurians were reintroduced to the series in 2010, and have recurred frequently since then. The Sea Devils were reintroduced with their designs mostly unchanged in 2022, and played a major role in the 2025 spin-off series The War Between the Land and the Sea.

Working under producer Terrance Dicks, Hulke came up with the idea of the Silurians to accommodate the show's need for more imaginative science fiction storylines during a period when its title character, the Doctor, was confined to present-day Earth. The Sea Devils were made out of a desire to bring the Silurian concept back. The further re-appearance of the pair in Warriors of the Deep was done out of a desire to bring back more antagonists following the series' twentieth anniversary. The species' redesign and re-appearance in the revived era was done to bring out the humanity in the species and allow the actors' performances to shine through, with a desire to update the Silurians to modern-day standards and expand on the concepts introduced in their original serials. Conversely, the Sea Devils' return did its best to stay as loyal to the original design of the creatures as possible.

The Silurians and Sea Devils' concept has been highlighted, though they were considered largely forgotten monsters until the Silurians' return in the revived era. In 2018, the notion of a pre-human intelligent reptilian or amphibious species was explored by the real-life scientists Adam Frank and Gavin Schmidt, who dubbed the concept the "Silurian hypothesis".

== Appearances ==
Doctor Who is a long-running British science-fiction television series that began in 1963. It stars its protagonist, The Doctor, an alien who travels through time and space in a ship known as the TARDIS, as well as their travelling companions. When the Doctor dies, they can undergo a process known as "regeneration", completely changing the Doctor's appearance and personality. Throughout their travels, the Doctor often comes into conflict with various alien species and antagonists.

The Silurians and Sea Devils are a race of reptilian humanoids from the dawn of time. The species was highly technologically advanced, and their computers detected that a planet-like object would collide with Earth. To survive, they put themselves into hibernation, but as the planet-like object, the Moon, never crashed into the Earth, the Silurians' computers never awoke them, leaving them trapped in hibernation.

=== Classic era ===
In their first appearance in Doctor Who and the Silurians (1970), a group of Silurians are awakened from hibernation by the energy from a nearby nuclear power research center in Derbyshire. The Third Doctor (Jon Pertwee) initially manages to negotiate an honourable compromise with the colony's leader. Unfortunately, the colony's leader is murdered by a younger Silurian who becomes the new leader, intent on a far more aggressive policy. To that end, the Silurians then attempt to reclaim the planet from humanity by releasing a deadly bacteria and attempting to disperse the Van Allen radiation belt. Both plans are thwarted by the Doctor. Despite the Doctor's best efforts to broker a peaceful solution, the Silurians are still determined to exterminate humanity, resulting in Brigadier Lethbridge-Stewart (Nicholas Courtney) blowing up their base to stop their plans.

In The Sea Devils (1972), the Sea Devils, an amphibious variety of Silurians, are awakened from their hibernation by a renegade Time Lord known as the Master (Roger Delgado), who persuades them to reclaim the planet from the human race. Despite the Third Doctor's efforts to convince them otherwise, the Sea Devils eventually decide to go to war, forcing the Doctor to destroy their base. It is revealed, however, that there were many colonies still in hibernation around the world. Both species, together, in Warriors of the Deep (1984), attempt again to reclaim Earth from the humans. Set in the year 2084 during a prolonged "cold war" between factions of humanity, the pair attempt to fire an undersea base's nuclear weapons, which would cause the humans to destroy each other in retaliation for the initial strike. The Fifth Doctor (Peter Davison) attempts to make peace with them, but is unable to, forcing him to flood the base with hexachromite gas, which is lethal to Silurians and Sea Devils, to stop them. While he attempts to save the Silurians, he is unable to succeed, leaving all of them dead by the serial's end.

=== Revived era ===
Silurians are reintroduced to the series, following its cancellation and revival, in the 2010 two-part story, "The Hungry Earth" and "Cold Blood", in which Silurians are awoken in 2020 by an underground drilling operation. Having misinterpreted the drilling as a deliberate attack, the Silurians take hostages. After a protracted conflict, the Eleventh Doctor (Matt Smith) leaves behind Tony Mack (Robert Pugh) and Nasreen Chaudhry (Meera Syal) in the Silurian city to act as ambassadors to the human race when they re-awaken in a thousand years.

Following this appearance, the Silurians make various cameo appearances. Some appear in "The Pandorica Opens" (2010), as one of the species who arrived to imprison the Doctor in the Pandorica. A Silurian appears in "The Wedding of River Song" (2011) in a timeline where all of history is happening at once. A Silurian appears in a video recording in "Dinosaurs on a Spaceship" (2012), where the Silurian reveals their species sent Arks into space to search for a new planet to inhabit. All of the Silurians on board of one of these were killed prior to the episode's events by a hunter named Solomon (David Bradley) who sought to procure the ship's dinosaur cargo for himself. A Silurian appears in "Joy to the World" (2024) where one acts as a manager to a hotel that lets visitors stay in places throughout Earth's history. The Silurian is killed by the villainous Villengard Corporation.

Recurring character Madame Vastra (Neve McIntosh) is introduced in "A Good Man Goes to War" (2011) as a Silurian detective in the Victorian era, who befriended the Doctor after a brief rampage on the London Underground. She lives with her human wife Jenny Flint (Catrin Stewart), and after "A Good Man Goes To War", also employs the Sontaran Strax (Dan Starkey) as her butler, forming the trio known as the Paternoster Gang. She re-appears in several subsequent episodes alongside the pair.

The Sea Devils re-appeared in the 2022 special "Legend of the Sea Devils". In the episode, a Sea Devil named Marsissus attempts to reclaim an artefact known as the Keystone in order to flood the world, but he and his crew of Sea Devils are killed in an explosion orchestrated by the Thirteenth Doctor. A different variety of Sea Devils play a central role in the 2025 spin-off series The War Between the Land and the Sea, although they are referred to as "Homo Aqua" in that series.

=== Spin-off appearances ===
The Silurians have additionally appeared in various novels, comics, and audio dramas since their debut. Silurian merchandise depicting the original design includes busts, different kinds of figurines, and cards. Sea Devil figurines, statues, cards, and other merchandise have been produced throughout the years.

== Creation and development ==
=== 1970s serials ===
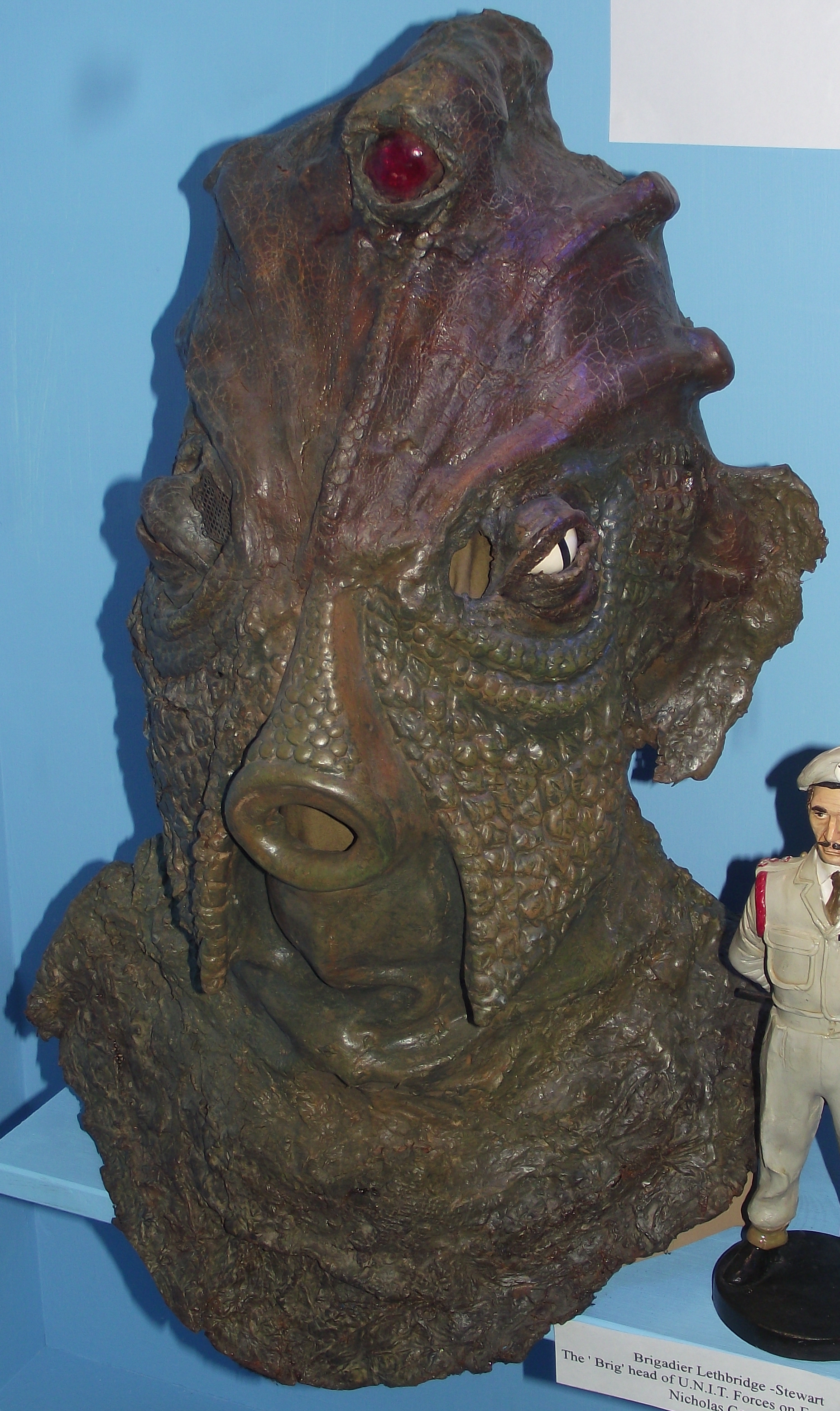
An original Silurian head, as used in Doctor Who and the Silurians

Drawing on the ideas of the Quatermass serials, producer Peter Bryant and producer and script editor Derrick Sherwin decided that for the series' seventh season, the show's protagonist the Doctor should be restricted to contemporary Earth and work alongside the UNIT organisation, featured prominently in the sixth season's serial The Invasion. Producer Barry Letts and script editor Terrance Dicks, inheriting this new vision for the series, also wanted their stories for the seventh season to have a serious, deeper subtext. They approached Malcolm Hulke, co-writer of the Patrick Troughton serials The Faceless Ones (1967) and The War Games (1969), to write a serial for this new season.

Dicks requested a story that took place in caves; Hulke saw limitations with this earthbound format, as he believed there would be two types of stories, one featuring mad scientists and the other alien invasions. Terrance Dicks claims credit for thinking of the idea of creatures that had been there all along; though The Complete History claims Hulke came up with the idea. The two settled on the name "Silurian", believing it conveyed a "monstrous" nature for the species. The Silurians' name was a misnomer, as the species was stated to hail from a period that was not the Silurian era. Though the subsequent serial featuring the Sea Devils attempted to rectify this by suggesting "Eocenes" as an alternative name, this too was inaccurate to the Silurians' time of origin. Another alternate name suggested for the species was "homo reptilia".

The original Silurian costumes were made by visual effects designer James Ward, with the costumes being based on sketches designed by BBC Staff Director Timothy Combe. Combe suggested the idea for the species to have a third eye. The costumes were hot to wear. Some of the costumes had lights fitted into the masks, allowing them to flash on and off, while the masks of the Silurians played by important characters having a peg that would move when the actors spoke. The Silurians in the original serial were portrayed by a variety of actors, with the leader Silurian portrayed by Dave Carter, the young Silurian portrayed by Nigel Johns, and the scientist portrayed by Pat Gorman, with their voices done by Peter Halliday.

While planning stories for Doctor Who's ninth season, Dicks and Letts decided to revive the Silurian concept, being impressed with the original idea. They wanted the Silurians to originate from the sea this time. Originally dubbed "Sea Silurians", they were rechristened "Sea Devils" for dramatic effect as Hulke's storyline was edited. The Sea Devils were originally planned to be naked like the Silurians, but director Michael E. Briant was uncomfortable with the idea, leading to the Sea Devils wearing string vests in the final episode, which were leftover from another show and hastily applied to the Sea Devils. The Sea Devils have a turtle-like head, with their heads sculpted by designer John Friedlander. Friedlander gave each head distinctive "webbing" to set them apart from each other, with small slits in the neck being used for the actors to see out of. The Sea Devils' guns were made with aluminum disks, with flash wool and gunpowder being used for them to simulate being fired, though this meant each Sea Devil could only fire their weapon once per take. A scene in which Sea Devils emerged from the waves was done by filling the Sea Devil masks with water, as they failed to go underwater otherwise; this led to the actors nearly drowning in the process. The episode's chief Sea Devil was portrayed by actor Peter Forbes-Robertson.

=== Warriors of the Deep (1984) ===
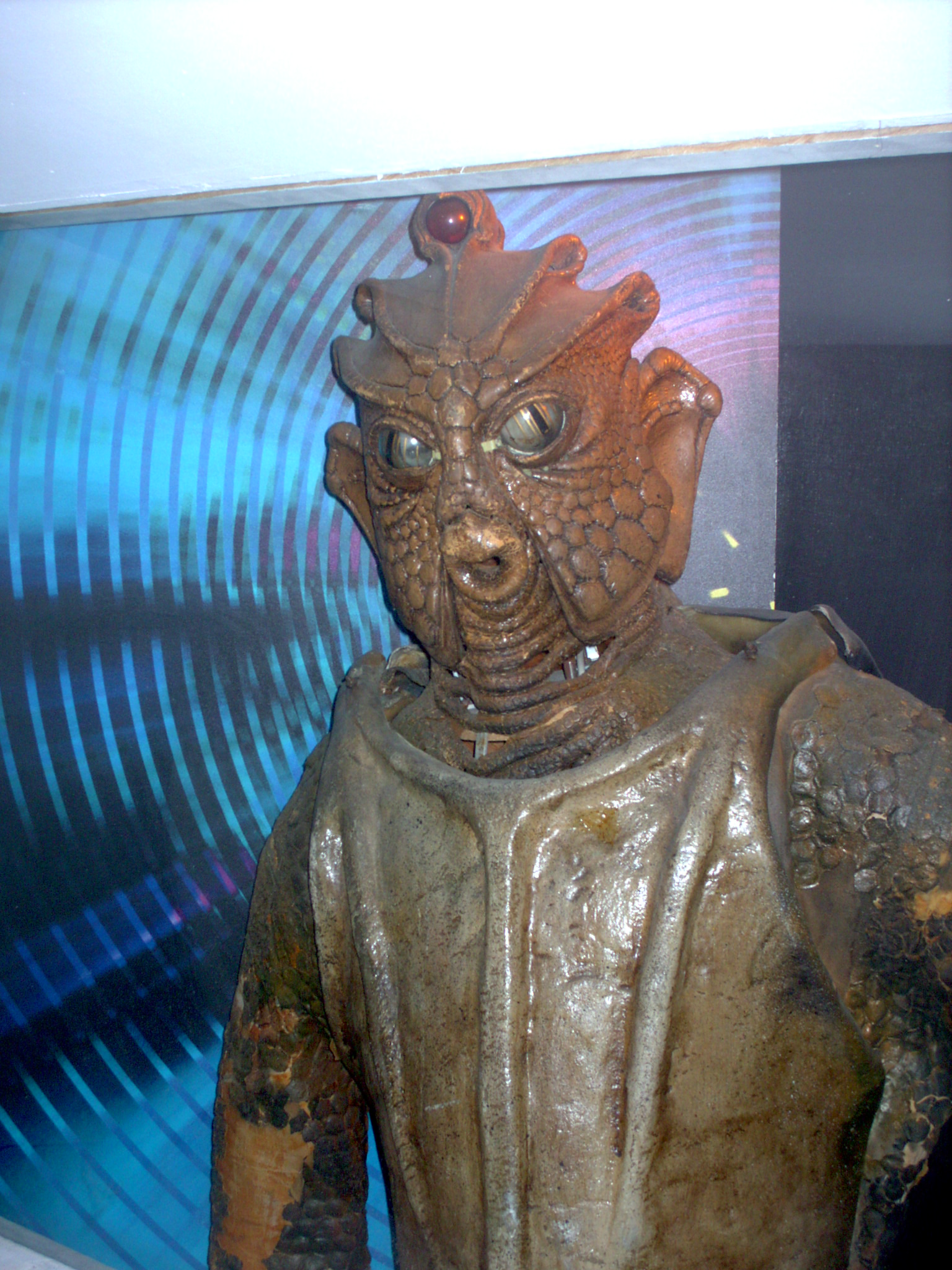
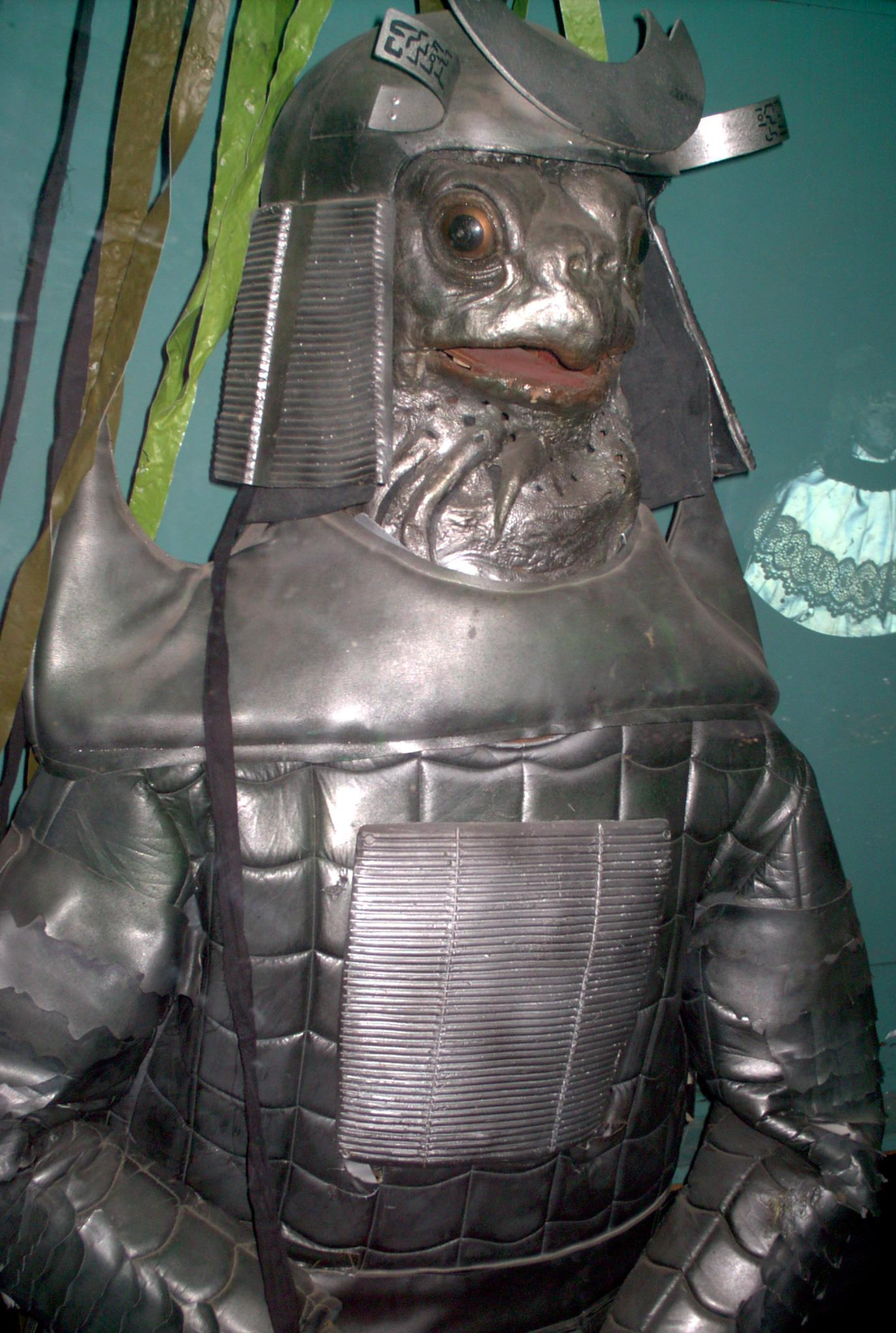
A Silurian and a Sea Devil, as seen in Warriors of the Deep, on display at the Doctor Who Experience

The 1984 season of Doctor Who followed the series' twentieth anniversary celebrations, and the production team wanted to mine the series' past for further antagonists to bring back. This resulted in the decision to bring the Silurians and Sea Devils back, appearing on-screen together for the first time. Writer Johnny Byrne was told to write serial Warriors of the Deep (1984) as a return for both the Silurians and the Sea Devils. After re-watching the original episodes, Byrne came up with the idea of the Sea Devils being a more militaristic force for the Silurians.

Redesign of the species was primarily done by Judy Pepperdine. The Silurians were redesigned to resemble an updated version of the original Silurian costume, with various departments working together to make the various aspects of the design. The Silurians' third eye was altered to glow when they spoke, while the eyeholes in the masks were redesigned to address actor complaints from the original serial. The Sea Devils were redesigned, with their string vests replaced by samurai-styled armor, which was done to give them more bulk. The Sea Devils' masks were based on an original mask from their debut serial that was on display at an exhibition. Radio control was added to allow the masks to blink. The masks for both creatures had major ventilation issues, resulting in the actors needing to be cooled down between takes, as the serial was filmed during a major heat wave. The masks sometimes were not buckled into costume correctly, and the Sea Devil masks would occasionally lean over or obscure an actor's vision, leading to Sea Devils bumping into each other during filming.

The Silurians had names, with the primary Silurian, Ichtar, being stated to be a Silurian from the original serial; the other two Silurians were named Scibus and Tarpok, with the latter's name being changed from Tanpon during production. Many script changes were made to ensure the continuity made sense between both Silurian serials; a reference to Ichtar discussing the Time Lords and the TARDIS was cut, as Ichtar would not have been able to know this information. The voices for both the Silurians and the Sea Devils were added in post-production. Actor Norman Comer portrays Ichtar, while Stuart Blake and Vincent Brimble portray Scibus and Tarpok, respectively. Various actors portray the Sea Devils.

=== Revived series ===
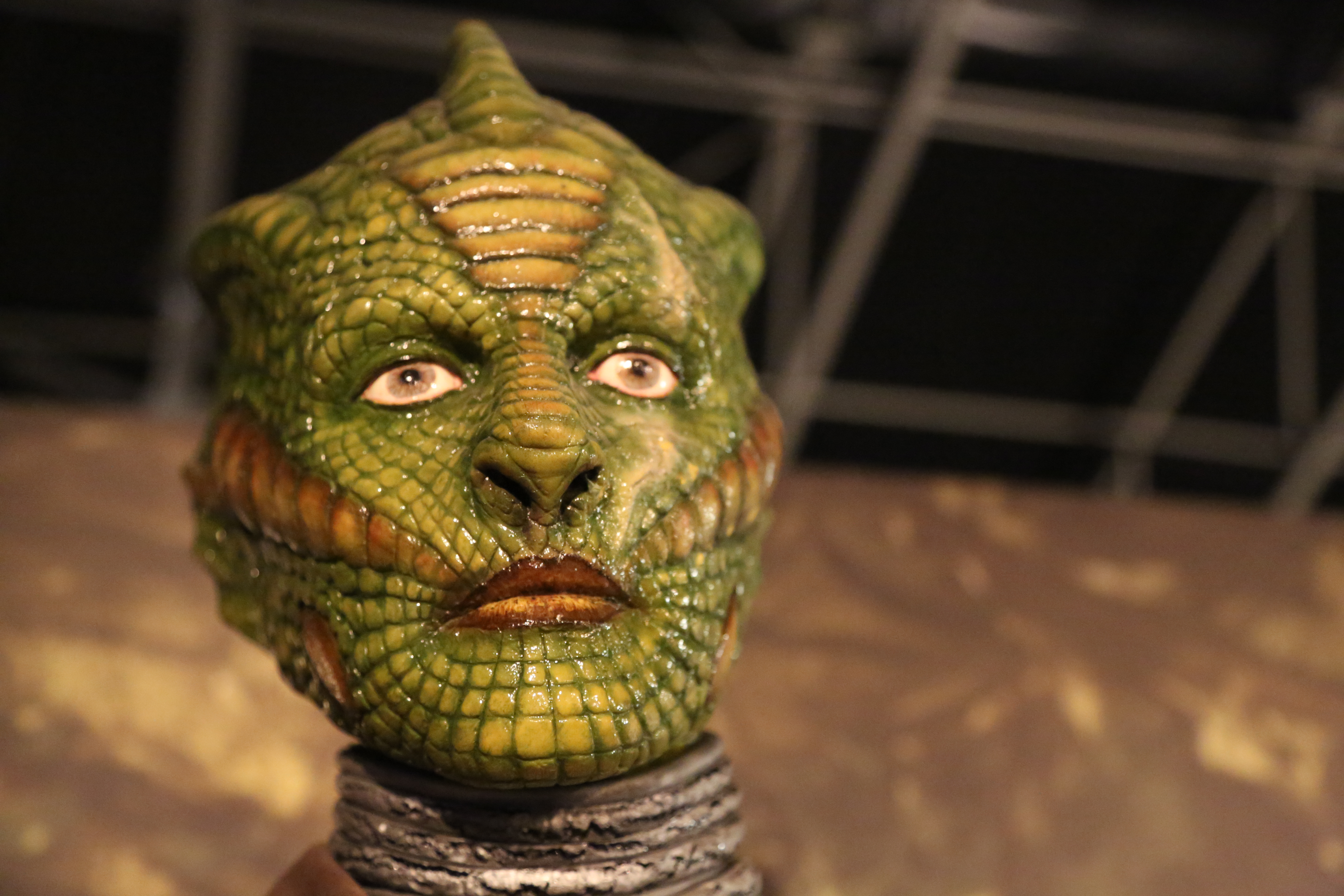
An sculpt of Madame Vastra's head, showcasing the modern Silurian design, as displayed at the Doctor Who Experience in 2013

The return of the Silurians in 2010's "The Hungry Earth" and "Cold Blood" was a request by series showrunner Steven Moffat, who asked writer Chris Chibnall to produce a script involving the species and a drill. Moffat stated the concept of the Silurians was a "movie franchise idea", and was inspired enough by the idea to want them to return to the series. Chibnall wrote the species as if audiences were completely unfamiliar with them, believing that a mainstream audience would likely not remember the species from the last time they had appeared on-screen. Moffat emphasized that they wanted to redesign the Silurians "for 2010". Chibnall, inspired by the usage of the phrase "homo reptilia", included male and female Silurians, instead of just male Silurians as had happened previously.

When redesigning the Silurians for the revived era of the series, design team Millenium FX assumed the design of the creatures would be an upscale of the original Silurian design from the classic era of the show. Moffat briefed Chibnall on how he wanted the Silurians to appear, stating that he envisioned the group in the two-parter as a "different branch" of the originals so that this new interpretation did not undermine the original Silurian stories. Chibnall's script stated that the species had to be "beautiful", with Moffat wanting to drop the Silurians' third eye to avoid confusion with antagonist Davros, who also sported one. The Silurians' voice modulation, present in previous stories, was also dropped. As Chibnall's script developed, however, designer Neil Gorton found that the humanity within the creatures would need to be better expressed. This resulted in the final humanoid design, which largely used prosthetics and makeup to convey the reptilian features of the species while letting the human actors emote with their own faces. Aspects of the Sea Devils' string vests and samurai armor were incorporated into the Silurians' clothing.

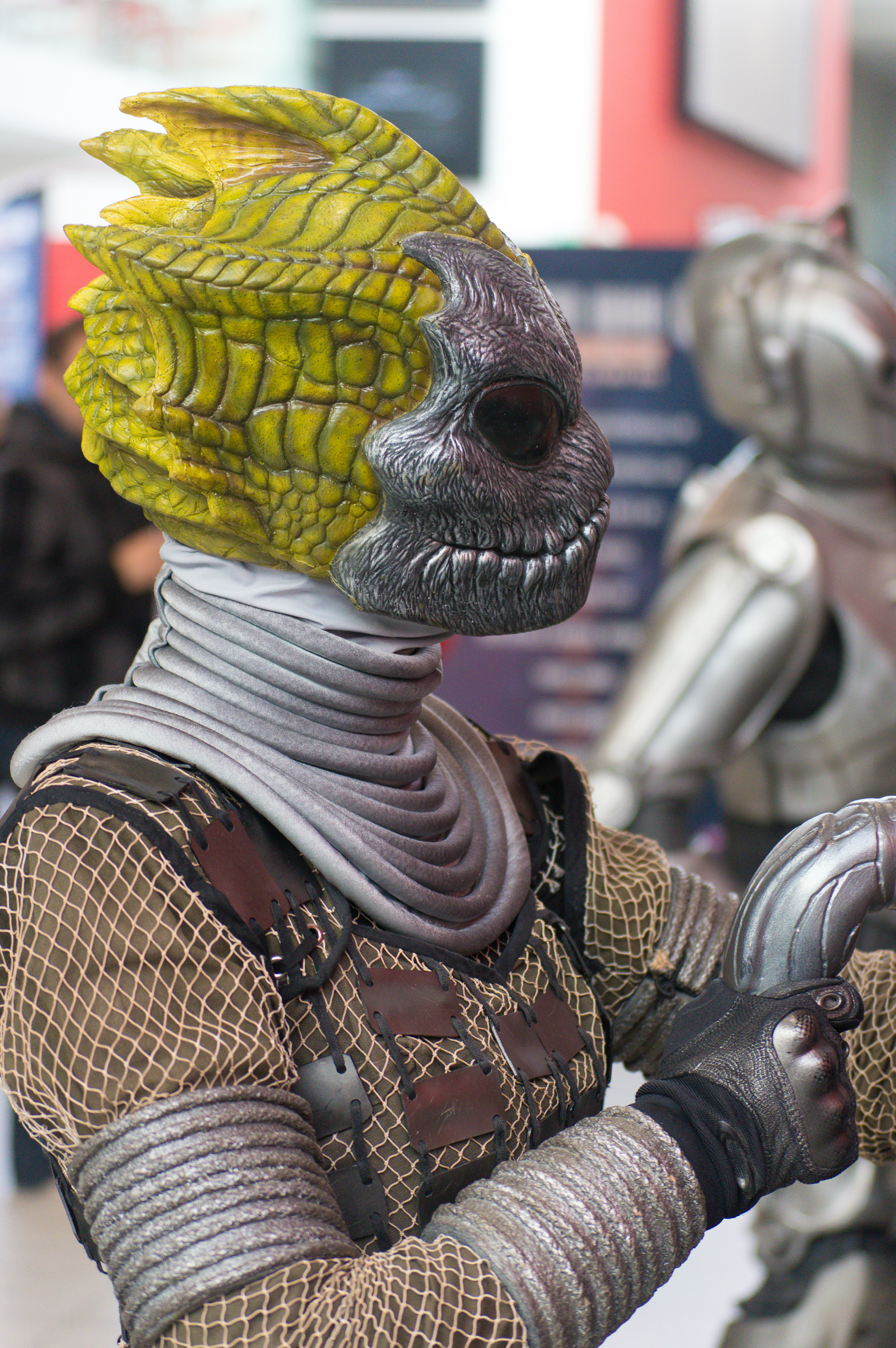
Silurians, with their masks on, on display at an exhibition

Other aspects of the Silurians' new designs included heat ray devices, which resembled those used by the Sea Devils, a venomous tongue, which Chibnall added so children could imitate the Silurians at the playground, and grey "warrior masks". The masks were created to cut down on prosthetics costs, as prosthetics were more expensive than other monster designs, which often only required a mask or costume. Chibnall additionally enjoyed the masks due to their ability to enhance the existing Silurian design. The Sea Devils were discussed to be brought back, but Chibnall decided against it, believing it would cause too much confusion within the story, and devalue the concept of "mirroring" between the humans and Silurians.

Several female supporting artists were hired to portray the Silurians, with reptilian body language being rehearsed, including motions such as sniffing to communicate, to add character to the Silurians. Actress Neve McIntosh portrays Silurian sisters Restac and Alaya in the two-parter. Her performance in the episodes led to her return as Silurian Madame Vastra in subsequent episodes.

The Sea Devils would eventually return in the 2022 episode "Legend of the Sea Devils". Unlike the Silurians, the Sea Devils retained largely the same design they had in their original appearances. The design team discussed how much the Sea Devils should resemble the original design, with the final design being the result of much discussion. The Sea Devils were made slightly shorter to account for lead actress Jodie Whittaker being shorter than former lead Jon Pertwee, who had originally fought them in their debut serial. The Sea Devils also had different costuming, which resembled pirate costumes, though aspects of their original netted clothing were included throughout the design. An original plaster cast from Warriors of the Deep was used to evaluate measurements of the new design. Episode co-writer Ella Road stated that despite the status of the Sea Devils as returning monsters, she and the rest of the team had "loads of creative freedom" with them. The episode's titular Sea Devil, Marsissus, was portrayed by actor Craige Els, who had previously portrayed Karvanista in the series. Other Sea Devils were portrayed by various other actors.

== Reception ==
In a review for the Radio Times, writer Mark Braxton stated that the original appearance of the Silurians, though held back by the cumbersome costumes used for the creatures, was effectively used by Hulke, with Braxton stating that "as a species they mirror our own suspicion, hatred and general insecurity." Slant Magazine highlighted how the Silurians were portrayed as "individuals", unlike other monsters in the series, which allowed them to have more interesting characterization and relationships. The book The Doctor's Monsters: Meanings of the Monstrous in Doctor Who similarly states that the Silurians were highly memorable antagonists as a result of the fact that the species was neither uniform nor evil, despite their physical appearance. It highlighted Warriors of the Deep for expanding on the original Silurian story by showing that, while violence was not the answer to the human and Silurian conflict, it showed via its mass deaths that violence between both sides would only lead to further violence instead of a viable solution. Susannah Lydon, writing for The Guardian, considered the Silurians to be an example of how speculative fiction engages with non-scientist audiences, highlighting their existence as part of a concept of "sleek, reptilian humanoids" existing in the Dinosaur era.

At the time of the Silurians' return to the modern series, the species had been largely forgotten by the general public, which The Guardian stated was emphasized by the lack of significant marketing or leaks regarding the species' return to the series. Their new design initially sparked some controversy among fans of the series, who disliked the sheer difference between the new and old Silurian designs. Slant Magazine highlighted the new design as helping to avoid the "man in a rubber suit" trope of the original design while bringing out the performance of the actor portraying the Silurian, though felt the new design could have incorporated more "alien" elements like the Silurians' third eye in order to appear less human. The design of the Silurians in the revived series was emphasized by the book Once Upon a Time Lord: The Myths and Stories of Doctor Who as symbolizing a "revitalization of the established mythology" in a respectful manner, which it felt was further emphasized by Madame Vastra, who acts as one of the series' first on-screen lesbian characters. The book New Dimensions of Doctor Who: Adventures in Space, Time and Television cited the Silurians as an example of the changing idea behind redesigns within the series; whereas prior to the Silurians' return, returning aliens tended to preserve the iconic or recognizable aspects of the species, the Silurians underwent a total redesign to instead emphasize other aspects of their character. In contrast, The Doctor's Monsters: Meanings of the Monstrous in Doctor Who stated that the use of prosthetics removed the alien aspects of the Silurians' designs and made them instead resemble humans with makeup; it felt that this weakened the strength of the Silurians, as it felt the Silurians' monstrous aspects yet human personalities were key aspects of the relationship between them and humans that were lost through the design change.

The book Who is Who?: The Philosophy of Doctor Who discussed the Silurians' relationship with the concept of the philosophical Other, which the book identifies as being the largest barrier between human and Silurian co-habitation in the series. It identifies a scene in "Cold Blood" where the Doctor attempts to broker peace between the two species, an occasion where the Doctor is willing to change history, as the character attempting to defy Georg Wilhelm Friedrich Hegel's idea that two sides seeking recognition will end with either side attempting to enslave or kill the other. The book New Dimensions of Doctor Who: Adventures in Space, Time and Television also analyzed the Silurians' role in this episode, analyzing how Murray Gold's musical score emphasizes the scenes featuring the Silurians.

The Sea Devils have been considered an iconic monster, with their debut serial being stated by Radio Times as having "gave British kids the shudders during their seaside holidays." The Guardian regarded the Sea Devils as being a "design classic". In a review for Radio Times, reviewer Patrick Mulkern praised the decision to bring back the Sea Devils in "Legend of the Sea Devils", but criticized their use in the episode, believing that they didn't get any proper opportunities to be scary antagonists. Chris Allcock, in a review for Den of Geek, stated that while the use of the old Sea Devil design gave the creatures a sense of weight, the execution of the costumes had "mixed results".

In 2018, the notion of a pre-human intelligent reptilian or amphibious species was explored by the real-life scientists Adam Frank and Gavin Schmidt, who dubbed the concept the "Silurian hypothesis", named after the creatures.
