= Doctor Who season 13 =

1975–76 season of British sci-fi TV series

Doctor Who
- Season 13
- Cover art of the Blu-ray release for the complete season
- Starring: Tom Baker; Elisabeth Sladen; Ian Marter
- No. of stories: 6
- No. of episodes: 26

Release
- Original network: BBC1
- Original release: 30 August 1975 – 6 March 1976

Season chronology
- ← Previous; Season 12 Next → Season 14

The thirteenth season of British science fiction television series Doctor Who began on 30 August 1975 with the story Terror of the Zygons, and ended with The Seeds of Doom. This is the second series to feature the Fourth Doctor, played by Tom Baker, with Philip Hinchcliffe producing and Robert Holmes script editing. In September 2009, it was ranked as readers' favourite season in Doctor Who Magazine issue 413.

== Casting ==
=== Main cast ===
- Tom Baker as the Fourth Doctor
- Elisabeth Sladen as Sarah Jane Smith
- Ian Marter as Harry Sullivan

Tom Baker continued his role as The Fourth Doctor along with Sarah Jane Smith (Elisabeth Sladen). Harry Sullivan, played by Ian Marter, departed in Terror of the Zygons and reappeared in The Android Invasion as a guest star.

=== Recurring cast ===
- Nicholas Courtney as Brigadier Lethbridge-Stewart
- John Levene as Sergeant Benton

Nicholas Courtney returned as Brigadier Lethbridge-Stewart in Terror of the Zygons having last appeared in Robot. John Levene makes his final appearance as Sergeant Benton in The Android Invasion after six years in the role.

== Serials ==
Terror of the Zygons was produced as part of the production schedule for Season 12, but was held for transmission from the end of that season to the beginning of Season 13, to coincide with a move from the new season starting at the beginning of the calendar year, to starting in late summer. Terror of the Zygons was also the last appearance of the Brigadier until Mawdryn Undead in Season 20. The season took a transmission break of two weeks over the Christmas 1975 period, between the broadcasts of The Android Invasion and The Brain of Morbius.

No. story	No. in season	Serial title	Episode titles	Directed by	Written by	Original release date	Prod. code	UK viewers (millions)	AI
80	1	Terror of the Zygons	"Part One"	Douglas Camfield	Robert Banks Stewart	30 August 1975	4F	8.4	59
80	1	Terror of the Zygons	"Part Two"	Douglas Camfield	Robert Banks Stewart	6 September 1975	4F	6.1	—
80	1	Terror of the Zygons	"Part Three"	Douglas Camfield	Robert Banks Stewart	13 September 1975	4F	8.2	54
80	1	Terror of the Zygons	"Part Four"	Douglas Camfield	Robert Banks Stewart	20 September 1975	4F	7.2	—
The Fourth Doctor is summoned to Earth by the Brigadier who is in Scotland investigating the mysterious loss of oil rigs, and discovers an alien invasion.
81	2	Planet of Evil	"Part One"	David Maloney	Louis Marks	27 September 1975	4H	10.4	56
81	2	Planet of Evil	"Part Two"	David Maloney	Louis Marks	4 October 1975	4H	9.9	56
81	2	Planet of Evil	"Part Three"	David Maloney	Louis Marks	11 October 1975	4H	9.1	57
81	2	Planet of Evil	"Part Four"	David Maloney	Louis Marks	18 October 1975	4H	10.1	54
An expedition is murdered. The Doctor and Sarah Jane land on the planet at the same time as the expedition's rescue team, and are immediately taken prisoner as the suspected murderers.
82	3	Pyramids of Mars	"Part One"	Paddy Russell	"Stephen Harris" (Lewis Greifer and Robert Holmes)	25 October 1975	4G	10.5	—
82	3	Pyramids of Mars	"Part Two"	Paddy Russell	"Stephen Harris" (Lewis Greifer and Robert Holmes)	1 November 1975	4G	11.3	—
82	3	Pyramids of Mars	"Part Three"	Paddy Russell	"Stephen Harris" (Lewis Greifer and Robert Holmes)	8 November 1975	4G	9.4	—
82	3	Pyramids of Mars	"Part Four"	Paddy Russell	"Stephen Harris" (Lewis Greifer and Robert Holmes)	15 November 1975	4G	11.7	60
The Osiran warmonger Sutekh seeks to be released from his prison and enlists servants on Earth.
83	4	The Android Invasion	"Part One"	Barry Letts	Terry Nation	22 November 1975	4J	11.9	58
83	4	The Android Invasion	"Part Two"	Barry Letts	Terry Nation	29 November 1975	4J	11.3	—
83	4	The Android Invasion	"Part Three"	Barry Letts	Terry Nation	6 December 1975	4J	12.1	—
83	4	The Android Invasion	"Part Four"	Barry Letts	Terry Nation	13 December 1975	4J	11.4	—
The Doctor and Sarah Jane land in a duplicate of an English village, complete with androids created by aliens as a testing ground for their invasion plot.
84	5	The Brain of Morbius	"Part One"	Christopher Barry	"Robin Bland" (Terrance Dicks and Robert Holmes)	3 January 1976	4K	9.5	—
84	5	The Brain of Morbius	"Part Two"	Christopher Barry	"Robin Bland" (Terrance Dicks and Robert Holmes)	10 January 1976	4K	9.3	—
84	5	The Brain of Morbius	"Part Three"	Christopher Barry	"Robin Bland" (Terrance Dicks and Robert Holmes)	17 January 1976	4K	10.1	57
84	5	The Brain of Morbius	"Part Four"	Christopher Barry	"Robin Bland" (Terrance Dicks and Robert Holmes)	24 January 1976	4K	10.2	—
Years ago, the renegade Time Lord known as Morbius was executed. When the Doctor and Sarah Jane arrive on the planet Karn, they discover that Dr Solon is creating a body so that Morbius may live again.
85	6	The Seeds of Doom	"Part One"	Douglas Camfield	Robert Banks Stewart	31 January 1976	4L	11.4	59
85	6	The Seeds of Doom	"Part Two"	Douglas Camfield	Robert Banks Stewart	7 February 1976	4L	11.4	—
85	6	The Seeds of Doom	"Part Three"	Douglas Camfield	Robert Banks Stewart	14 February 1976	4L	10.3	—
85	6	The Seeds of Doom	"Part Four"	Douglas Camfield	Robert Banks Stewart	21 February 1976	4L	11.1	—
85	6	The Seeds of Doom	"Part Five"	Douglas Camfield	Robert Banks Stewart	28 February 1976	4L	9.9	—
85	6	The Seeds of Doom	"Part Six"	Douglas Camfield	Robert Banks Stewart	6 March 1976	4L	11.5	—
Scientists uncover two giant seedpods buried in the Antarctic permafrost for thousands of years. Ruthless plant-lover Harrison Chase decides he must have them for his rare collection, but the pods may spell the end of all non-plant life on Earth.

== Production ==
=== Scrapped stories ===
Multiple stories were scrapped during the production of the season. The original version of Pyramids of Mars by Lewis Greifer was scrapped, and unlike the final story, would have featured a group attempting to gain access to wild rice hailing from thousands of years ago in an Egyptian sarcophagus to seed Mars for profit. After Greifer became ill, the story was rewritten in its entirety by Robert Holmes. The Eye of Nemesis by Brian Hayles would have depicted a hunter named Torr chasing the Doctor and Sarah, with Torr working for recurring antagonist the Toymaker. David Wiltshire's The Menday Fault, an unsolicited script, would have involved a nuclear submarine diving into the Fault of Menday and discovering a subterranean world, though Wiltshire was ultimately never commissioned for the storyline. The Nightmare Planet, written by Dennis Spooner, would have centred around a planet where drugs in the food and water are used to control the populace, and temporary withdrawal of the drugs would cause people to see monsters. Other stories scrapped from the season included The Angarath by Eric Pringle, The Haunting by Terrance Dicks, and Return to Sukannan by Terry Nation. The Prisoner of Time, a scrapped concept written by Barry Letts, was intended to be based on an audition piece for the role of Sarah Jane Smith Letts had previously written in 1973. The Silent Scream was a scrapped idea from Chris Boucher, before Boucher was ultimately commissioned to write The Face of Evil.

== Broadcast ==
The entire season was broadcast from 30 August 1975 to 6 March 1976, but with a three week break between the fourth and fifth serials from 13 December 1975 to 3 January 1976.

== Home media ==
=== VHS releases ===
Season	Story no.	Serial name	Duration	Release date		
Season	Story no.	Serial name	Duration	UK	Australia	USA / Canada
13	80	Terror of the Zygons	1 × 100 min.	November 1988	April 1987	April 1991
13	80	Terror of the Zygons	4 × 25 min.	August 1999	January 2000	May 2000
13	81	Planet of Evil	4 × 25 min.	February 1994	March 1994	June 1996
13	82	Pyramids of Mars	1 × 100 min.	February 1985	November 1985	February 1988
13	82	Pyramids of Mars	4 × 25 min.	April 1994	—N/a	March 1998
13	83	The Android Invasion	4 × 25 min.	March 1995	March 1995	March 1996
13	84	The Brain of Morbius	1 × 60 min.	July 1984	November 1987	November 1987
13	84	The Brain of Morbius	4 × 25 min.	July 1990	January 1991	February 1997
13	85	The Seeds of Doom	6 × 25 min.	August 1994; 2 × VHS	October 1994	September 1995

=== Betamax releases ===
Season	Story no.	Serial name	Duration	Release date		
Season	Story no.	Serial name	Duration	UK	Australia	USA / Canada
13	82	Pyramids of Mars	1 × 100 min.	February 1985	—N/a	—N/a
13	84	The Brain of Morbius	1 × 60 min.	July 1984	—N/a	—N/a

=== Video 2000 releases ===
Season	Story no.	Serial name	Duration	Release date		
Season	Story no.	Serial name	Duration	UK	Australia	USA / Canada
13	84	The Brain of Morbius	1 × 60 min.	July 1984	—N/a	—N/a

=== Laserdisc releases ===
Season	Story no.	Serial name	Duration	Release date		
Season	Story no.	Serial name	Duration	UK	Australia	USA / Canada
13	80	Terror of the Zygons	4 × 25 min.	December 1997	—N/a	—N/a
13	84	The Brain of Morbius (edited)	1 × 60 min.	July 1984	—N/a	—N/a

=== DVD and Blu-ray releases ===
All releases are for DVD unless otherwise indicated:

- ^{(B)} indicates a Blu-ray release

Season	Story no.	Serial name	Duration	Release date		
Season	Story no.	Serial name	Duration	R2	R4	R1
13	80	Terror of the Zygons (Note: Advanced release in region 2 as part of 'The Fourth Doctor Time Capsule' set with no special features on 29 July 2013)	4 × 25 min.	29 July 2013; 30 September 2013 (Note: The Region 2 release of Terror of the Zygons was released in advance as part of The Fourth Doctor Time Capsule box set without special features, and was later re-released on its own with special features.)	2 October 2013	8 October 2013
13	81	Planet of Evil	4 × 25 min.	15 October 2007	5 December 2007	4 March 2008
13	82	Pyramids of Mars (Note: Also available as part of The Doctors Revisited 1-4 in Regions 1 and 4)	4 × 25 min.	1 March 2004	10 June 2004	7 September 2004
13	83	The Android Invasion (Note: Only available as part of the U.N.I.T. Files box set in Regions 2 and 4. Only available individually in Region 1.)	4 × 25 min.	9 January 2012	5 January 2012	10 January 2012
13	84	The Brain of Morbius	4 × 25 min.	21 July 2008	2 October 2008	7 October 2008
13	85	The Seeds of Doom	6 × 25 min.	25 October 2010	2 December 2010	8 March 2011
13	80–85	Complete Season 13 (Note: Released as Doctor Who: The Collection – Season 13 in Region B. Released as Doctor Who – Tom Baker: Complete Season Two in Region A.)	26 × 25 min.	20 October 2025 ^{(B)}	3 December 2025	20 January 2026 ^{(B)}

== In print ==
Season	Story no.	Library no. (Note: Number in Target's Doctor Who Library, if applicable)	Novelisation title	Author	Hardcover release date (Note: Published by Target's parent companies (Allen Wingate, W. H. Allen, BBC Books) unless otherwise indicated)	Paperback release date (Note: Published by Target Books (or by BBC Books under the Target Collection umbrella) unless otherwise indicated)	Audiobook	
Season	Story no.	Library no.	Novelisation title	Author	Hardcover release date	Paperback release date	Release date (Note: Unabridged from BBC Audio / AudioGo unless otherwise indicated)	Narrator
13	080	40	Doctor Who and the Loch Ness Monster	Terrance Dicks	15 January 1976		1978 (Note: Published by the Royal National Institute of the Blind)	Gabriel Woolf
13	080	40	Doctor Who and the Loch Ness Monster	Terrance Dicks	15 January 1976		16 October 2025	Jon Culshaw
13	081	47	Doctor Who and the Planet of Evil	Terrance Dicks	21 July 1977	18 August 1977	6 April 2023	Tim Treloar
13	082	50	Doctor Who and the Pyramids of Mars	Terrance Dicks	16 December 1976		14 August 2008	Tom Baker
13	083	2	Doctor Who and the Android Invasion	Terrance Dicks	16 November 1978		18 August 2022	Geoffrey Beevers
13	084	7	Doctor Who and the Brain of Morbius	Terrance Dicks	19 May 1977	23 June 1977	4 February 2008	Tom Baker
13	084	—N/a	Junior Doctor Who and the Brain of Morbius	Terrance Dicks	27 June 1980	13 November 1980	—N/a	
13	085	55	Doctor Who and the Seeds of Doom	Philip Hinchcliffe	17 February 1977		5 September 2019	Michael Kilgarriff
