= Doctor Who season 12 =

1974–75 season of British sci-fi TV series

Doctor Who
- Season 12
- Cover art of the Blu-ray release for the complete season
- Starring: Tom Baker; Elisabeth Sladen; Ian Marter
- No. of stories: 5
- No. of episodes: 20

Release
- Original network: BBC1
- Original release: 28 December 1974 – 10 May 1975

Season chronology
- ← Previous; Season 11 Next → Season 13

The twelfth season of British science fiction television series Doctor Who began on 28 December 1974 with Tom Baker's first serial Robot, and ended with Revenge of the Cybermen on 10 May 1975.

This is the first season to feature Tom Baker as the fourth incarnation of the Doctor, an alien Time Lord who travels through time and space in his TARDIS, which appears to be a British police box on the outside. He is accompanied by companions Sarah Jane Smith (Elisabeth Sladen), continuing from season eleven, and Harry Sullivan (Ian Marter), who joins in this season. With Barry Letts and Terrance Dicks having both departed along with Jon Pertwee, new producer Philip Hinchcliffe and new script editor Robert Holmes worked on this series. Letts's last story as producer was Robot, with Hinchcliffe producing the rest of the season. Holmes had previously written for the programme.

== Casting ==
=== Main cast ===
- Tom Baker as the Fourth Doctor
- Elisabeth Sladen as Sarah Jane Smith
- Ian Marter as Harry Sullivan

During production of season eleven, it was known that Jon Pertwee would be leaving his role as the Third Doctor and that a new Fourth Doctor would need to be cast for the part. Tom Baker was an out-of-work actor, working in construction at the time. Baker had been a television and film actor, having major parts in several films including The Vault of Horror (1973) and as the main antagonist in The Golden Voyage of Sinbad the same year. He had written to Bill Slater, the Head of Serials at the BBC, asking for work. Slater suggested Baker to Doctor Who producer Barry Letts who had been looking to fill the part. Letts had been the producer of the series since the early Pertwee serials in 1970. He had seen Baker's work in The Golden Voyage of Sinbad and hired him for the part. Baker would continue in his role as the Doctor for seven seasons, longer than any other actor to play the part.

Elisabeth Sladen returned to play the role of companion Sarah Jane Smith throughout the season. Ian Marter joined the cast as Harry Sullivan. The character was created before Baker was cast; there had been discussion of casting an older actor as the Doctor, and so Harry was created as a younger character to handle the action scenes.

=== Recurring cast ===
- Nicholas Courtney as Brigadier Lethbridge-Stewart
- John Levene as Warrant Officer Benton

Nicholas Courtney and John Levene reprised their roles as the Brigadier and Warrant Officer Benton respectively in the first serial, Robot. Courtney had begun his role in the Second Doctor story The Web of Fear (1968), where the character was a colonel. Levene had begun in Second Doctor story The Invasion (1968), replacing another actor. Both were members of the military organization United Nations Intelligence Taskforce (UNIT). They, along with Sladen, would be the transition cast to carry through from the Third Doctor to the Fourth Doctor, though Robot is the only UNIT story for the twelfth season.

== Serials ==
After Robot, all the serials in this season continue directly one after the other, tracing one single problematic voyage of the TARDIS crew. Despite the continuity, each serial is considered its own standalone story.

The season was initially formatted as the previous Pertwee season had been with three six-part stories and two four-part stories. To this end, the initial structure was to open with the four-part Robot and the four-part Space Station by Christopher Langley followed by three six-parters – Genesis of Terror (later retitled Genesis of the Daleks), Loch Ness, and another six-part story to be determined. Script editor Robert Holmes discussed with Philip Hinchcliffe the possibility of replacing the as-yet undecided six-parter with a four-part story and a two-parter, both with the same production team. The season structure later became two four-part stories (Robot and a replacement for Space Station, The Ark in Space), the new two-parter The Destructors (later retitled The Sontaran Experiment), the six-part Genesis of Terror, and a four-part version of Loch Ness (later retitled Terror of the Zygons and held over for season 13). This decision made The Sontaran Experiment the first two-part story since Season 2's The Rescue. It was also the first to be shot entirely on location since Jon Pertwee's opening story Spearhead from Space in Season 7, and the first to be shot entirely on videotape instead of 16mm film, as was usual for location shooting. As a means of saving money, The Ark in Space and Revenge of the Cybermen were shot on the same sets.

No. story	No. in season	Serial title	Episode titles	Directed by	Written by	Original release date	Prod. code	UK viewers (millions)	AI
75	1	Robot	"Part One"	Christopher Barry	Terrance Dicks	28 December 1974	4A	10.8	53
75	1	Robot	"Part Two"	Christopher Barry	Terrance Dicks	4 January 1975	4A	10.7	53
75	1	Robot	"Part Three"	Christopher Barry	Terrance Dicks	11 January 1975	4A	10.1	—
75	1	Robot	"Part Four"	Christopher Barry	Terrance Dicks	18 January 1975	4A	9.0	51
Sarah investigates the National Institute for Advanced Scientific Research, colloquially known as the "Think Tank". She finds that director Hilda Winters, her assistant Arnold Jellicoe, and former Think Tank member Professor J.P. Kettlewell are developing a robot, K1, out of living metal; and Winters and Jellicoe have secretly instructed K1 to steal international nuclear launch codes from the government. K1 discovers Sarah's presence and when UNIT arrives, the three conspirators and K1 escape with Sarah as their hostage. Winters sends a list of demands to the world governments, then orders Kettlewell to connect to the launch computers. Kettlewell hesitates, and Sarah and Harry attempt to escape. Winters orders K1 to stop them, but the robot inadvertently fires the disintegrator gun at Kettlewell; UNIT forces take Winters and Jellicoe away and K1 seeks out Sarah to protect her, an effect of Sarah's previous compassion; and then absorbs a disintegrator ray blast and grows to an enormous size. The Doctor returns, and uses a metal virus designed by Kettlewell to defeat the robot. Sarah is saddened by the loss of K1. The Doctor offers to cheer her up with a trip in the TARDIS, extending the invitation to Harry as well.
76	2	The Ark in Space	"Part One"	Rodney Bennett	Robert Holmes	25 January 1975	4C	9.4	—
76	2	The Ark in Space	"Part Two"	Rodney Bennett	Robert Holmes	1 February 1975	4C	13.6	—
76	2	The Ark in Space	"Part Three"	Rodney Bennett	Robert Holmes	8 February 1975	4C	11.2	—
76	2	The Ark in Space	"Part Four"	Rodney Bennett	Robert Holmes	15 February 1975	4C	10.2	—
Thousands of years in the future, an insectoid alien race known as the Wirrn intend to absorb the humans on board Space Station Nerva.
77	3	The Sontaran Experiment	"Part One"	Rodney Bennett	Bob Baker and Dave Martin	22 February 1975	4B	11.0	—
77	3	The Sontaran Experiment	"Part Two"	Rodney Bennett	Bob Baker and Dave Martin	1 March 1975	4B	10.5	55
On a future Earth, the Sontaran Field Major Styre experiments on humans he trapped there.
78	4	Genesis of the Daleks	"Part One"	David Maloney	Terry Nation	8 March 1975	4E	10.7	—
78	4	Genesis of the Daleks	"Part Two"	David Maloney	Terry Nation	15 March 1975	4E	10.5	57
78	4	Genesis of the Daleks	"Part Three"	David Maloney	Terry Nation	22 March 1975	4E	8.5	—
78	4	Genesis of the Daleks	"Part Four"	David Maloney	Terry Nation	29 March 1975	4E	8.8	58
78	4	Genesis of the Daleks	"Part Five"	David Maloney	Terry Nation	5 April 1975	4E	9.8	57
78	4	Genesis of the Daleks	"Part Six"	David Maloney	Terry Nation	12 April 1975	4E	9.1	56
The Fourth Doctor, Sarah, and Harry are sent on a mission to Skaro to change the Dalek's history at their beginning to prevent them from becoming the dominant race. A war between the Thals and the Kaleds has left it nearly inhospitable. Sarah Jane is captured by the Thals; the Doctor and Harry by the Kaleds, and taken to a bunker where they meet the lead scientist Davros, who unveils his new invention, the Dalek. When halted from proceeding by the leadership, Davros covertly provides the Thal leaders a way to attack the Kaleds. Sarah is rescued; all Kaleds not in the bunker are killed. The Daleks attack the Thals. The survivors make their way to the bunker, and the Doctor goes inside. The Doctor rigs the Dalek incubation room with explosives, but hesitates to detonate them, questioning whether he has the right to make that decision. The Daleks return and exterminate the remaining Kaleds. A Dalek inadvertently sets off the explosives. The Doctor escapes before a bomb caves in the bunker, trapping Davros and the Daleks, who seemingly exterminate Davros. The Doctor considers his mission complete: out of the Daleks' evil, good will always arise to challenge them.
79	5	Revenge of the Cybermen	"Part One"	Michael E. Briant	Gerry Davis	19 April 1975	4D	9.5	57
79	5	Revenge of the Cybermen	"Part Two"	Michael E. Briant	Gerry Davis	26 April 1975	4D	8.3	—
79	5	Revenge of the Cybermen	"Part Three"	Michael E. Briant	Gerry Davis	3 May 1975	4D	8.9	—
79	5	Revenge of the Cybermen	"Part Four"	Michael E. Briant	Gerry Davis	10 May 1975	4D	9.4	58
The Doctor, Harry and Sarah Jane find themselves on Space Station Nerva but millennia earlier when it was just a beacon for incoming and outgoing space ships, where a lethal infection is spreading through the crew.

== Production ==
Barry Letts served as producer for Robot, after which he was succeeded by Philip Hinchcliffe. Robert Holmes took over from Terrance Dicks as script editor.

Robot was written by Dicks, who cited King Kong as an influence for the serial. Dicks incorporated several familiar elements from the Third Doctor's first story Spearhead from Space (1970), which helped the audience transition between actors. Initially, Christopher Langley's Space Station was planned for the season, but ultimately was replaced by The Ark in Space. The Ark in Space was written by Robert Holmes from a story by John Lucarotti that was considered unusable. Letts and Dicks were eager to have Terry Nation return to write the Daleks, but initially found his script too similar to past Dalek adventures. They suggested that he write a Dalek origin story instead, which became Genesis of the Daleks. However, under Hinchcliffe, the serial gained a darker tone.

The sets of The Ark in Space were reused for Revenge of the Cybermen. Genesis of the Daleks was the last serial of the season to be filmed, after Revenge of the Cybermen. This took place in January and February 1975.

== Broadcast ==
The entire season was broadcast from 28 December 1974 to 10 May 1975.

The title sequence for Part One of The Ark in Space was tinted sepia as an experiment, but was not repeated for subsequent episodes.

== Home media ==
=== VHS releases ===
Season	Story no.	Serial name	Duration	Release date		
Season	Story no.	Serial name	Duration	UK	Australia	USA / Canada
12	75	Robot	4 × 25 min.	February 1992	July 1992	May 1994
12	76	The Ark in Space	1 × 100 min.	June 1989	January 1989	April 1991
12	76	The Ark in Space	4 × 25min.	April 1994	—N/a	—N/a
12	77; 78	The Sontaran Experiment; Genesis of the Daleks	8 × 25 min.	October 1991	July 1992	February 1994
12	79	Revenge of the Cybermen	1 × 100 min.	October 1983; May 1984 (reissue)	January 1987	December 1986
12	79	Revenge of the Cybermen	4 × 25 min.	April 1999	December 1999	—N/a

=== Betamax releases ===
Season	Story no.	Serial name	Duration	Release date		
Season	Story no.	Serial name	Duration	UK	Australia	USA / Canada
12	79	Revenge of the Cybermen	1 × 100 min.	October 1983	—N/a	—N/a

=== Video 2000 releases ===
Season	Story no.	Serial name	Duration	Release date		
Season	Story no.	Serial name	Duration	UK	Australia	USA / Canada
12	79	Revenge of the Cybermen	1 × 100 min.	October 1983	—N/a	—N/a

=== Laserdisc releases ===
Season	Story no.	Serial name	Duration	Release date		
Season	Story no.	Serial name	Duration	UK	Australia	USA / Canada
12	76	The Ark in Space	4 × 25 min.	October 1996	—N/a	—N/a
12	79	Revenge of the Cybermen (edited)	1 × 92 min.	December 1983	—N/a	—N/a

=== DVD and Blu-ray releases ===
All releases are for DVD unless otherwise indicated:

- ^{(B)} indicates a Blu-ray release

Season	Story no.	Serial name	Duration	Release date		
Season	Story no.	Serial name	Duration	R2	R4	R1
12	75	Robot	4 × 25 min.	4 June 2007	4 July 2007	14 August 2007
12	76	The Ark in Space	4 × 25 min.	8 April 2002	3 June 2002	6 August 2002
12	76	The Ark in Space (Special Edition)	4 × 25 min.	25 February 2013	27 February 2013	12 March 2013
12	77	The Sontaran Experiment (Note: Available individually or in the Bred for War box set in Regions 2 and 4. Only available individually in Region 1.)	2 × 25 min.	9 October 2006	7 August 2008	6 March 2007
12	78	Genesis of the Daleks (Note: Available individually or in The Complete Davros Collection box set in Regions 2 and 4. Only available individually in Region 1.)	6 × 25 min.	10 April 2006	4 May 2006	6 June 2006
12	79	Revenge of the Cybermen (Note: Only available as part of the Cybermen box set in Regions 2 and 4. Only available individually in Region 1.)	4 × 25 min.	9 August 2010	7 October 2010	2 November 2010
12	75–79	Complete Season 12 (Note: Released as Doctor Who: The Collection – Season 12 in Region B. Released as Doctor Who – Tom Baker: Complete Season One in Region A.)	20 × 25 min. 1 × 150 min.	2 July 2018 ^{(B)}	1 August 2018 ^{(B)}	19 June 2018 ^{(B)}

== In print ==
Season	Story no.	Library no. (Note: Number in Target's Doctor Who Library, if applicable)	Novelisation title	Author	Hardcover release date (Note: Published by Target's parent companies (Allen Wingate, W. H. Allen, BBC Books) unless otherwise indicated)	Paperback release date (Note: Published by Target Books (or by BBC Books under the Target Collection umbrella) unless otherwise indicated)	Audiobook	
Season	Story no.	Library no.	Novelisation title	Author	Hardcover release date	Paperback release date	Release date (Note: Unabridged from BBC Audio / AudioGo unless otherwise indicated)	Narrator
12	075	28	Doctor Who and the Giant Robot	Terrance Dicks	17 April 1986	13 March 1975	5 November 2007	Tom Baker
12	075	—N/a	Junior Doctor Who and the Giant Robot	Terrance Dicks	December 1979	Early 1980	—N/a	
12	076	4	Doctor Who and the Ark in Space	Ian Marter	21 April 1977	10 May 1977	16 July 2015	Jon Culshaw
12	077	56	Doctor Who and the Sontaran Experiment	Ian Marter	7 December 1978		7 July 2016	Jon Culshaw
12	078	27	Doctor Who and the Genesis of the Daleks	Terrance Dicks	22 July 1976		10 July 2012 (Note: Published by the Royal National Institute of the Blind)	Terry Molloy
12	078	27	Doctor Who and the Genesis of the Daleks	Terrance Dicks	22 July 1976		5 October 2017	Jon Culshaw (Note: Dalek voices performed by Nicholas Briggs)
12	079	51	Doctor Who and the Revenge of the Cybermen	Terrance Dicks	20 May 1976		3 February 2022	Nicholas Briggs
