= Michael Spice =

British actor (1931–1983)

- Born: Michael William Spice; 20 May 1931; Croydon, Surrey, England
- Died: 2 November 1983 (aged 52); Dartford, Kent, England
- Occupation: Actor
- Notable work: Doctor Who

Michael Spice (20 May 1931 – 2 November 1983) was a British character actor who appeared in television roles.

== Career ==
Educated at Beckenham Grammar School, Spice aspired to become an actor after watching a performance of Peter Pan at the Grand Theatre in Croydon as a boy. Graduating from the Royal Academy of Dramatic Art during the summer of 1953, he immediately began his career by landing a chorus job in The Glorious Days at the Palace Theatre in the West End. This was followed by joining the Ipswich Arts Theatre for 15 months, acting as assistant stage manager with small roles then moving to stage manager with bigger roles. Afterwards, he played small parts in John Gielgud's touring revivals of Much Ado About Nothing and King Lear plus understudied the male lead in Peter Ustinov's comedy Romanoff and Juliet at Piccadilly Theatre, as well as Robert Eddison in Henrik Ibsen's Little Eyolf at the Lyric Theatre (Hammersmith). Further excursions led to other places including Coventry, Margate, Hull and Leatherhead.

On TV, Spice portrayed two Doctor Who villains, the voice of Morbius in The Brain of Morbius, and Weng-Chiang / Magnus Greel in The Talons of Weng-Chiang. Other screen roles included minor characters in The Brothers, Public Eye and Blake's 7, as well as being directed by Charlie Chaplin in the film A Countess from Hong Kong.

More of a prolific radio actor Spice made over 1000 broadcasts. He played the character of Peter Tyson in the BBC Radio play The Ropewalk in January 1969. The play evolved into the long-running BBC Radio 2 serial Waggoners' Walk, in which Basil Moss took over the role of Peter Tyson, with Spice taking the role of Matt Prior, a role he played until the serial's end in May 1980. Another memorable contribution was voicing Háma and a Nazgûl in the BBC Radio 4 1981 dramatisation of J. R. R Tolkien's three-part epic novel The Lord of the Rings.
