= Geoffrey Burgon =

British composer

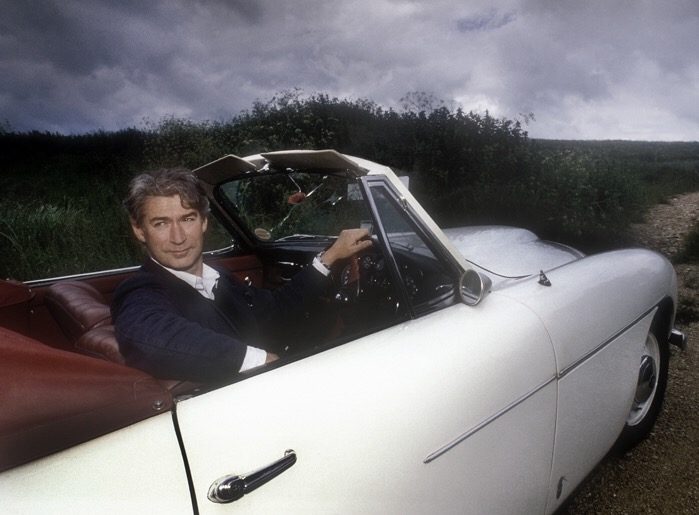
- Burgon at Hales Grove, c. 1980s

Background information
- Born: 15 July 1941; Hampshire, England
- Died: 21 September 2010 (aged 69) Gloucestershire, England
- Occupation: Composer

Geoffrey Alan Burgon (15 July 1941 – 21 September 2010) was an English composer best known for his television and film scores. Among his most recognisable works are Monty Python's Life of Brian for film, and Tinker Tailor Soldier Spy and Brideshead Revisited for television, the latter two earning Ivor Novello Awards in 1979 and 1981 respectively. He also won BAFTAs for his themes for the remake of The Forsyte Saga and Longitude.

Burgon also achieved success and a serious following with vocal, orchestral, concert and stage works.

== Life and career ==
Burgon was born in Hambledon, Hampshire, in 1941, son of Alan Wybert Burgon (died 1983) and Ada Vera, née Isom. He had Huguenot ancestry. He taught himself the trumpet in order to join a jazz band at school (Pewley Grammar School, Guildford). He entered the Guildhall School of Music and Drama with the intention of becoming a professional trumpet player. However, under the direction of his mentor, composer Peter Wishart, he found that he was more interested in composition. Burgon initially supported himself and his family as a freelance jazz trumpeter. At the age of 30 he sold his instruments, except one, and devoted himself to composition. He lived through a lengthy period of poverty before critical success eventually brought financial reward.

The critical success of his Requiem at the Three Choirs Festival in 1976 sealed his reputation as a composer and led to many commissions from major organisations. Continuing the tradition established by Benjamin Britten, Burgon's fluent and effortless language was particularly well suited to the voice and he had a long-standing collaboration with counter-tenor James Bowman. Burgon also had considerable success writing for film and television and twice received both BAFTA and Ivor Novello Awards.

His style was essentially conservative, influenced by Benjamin Britten and medieval music rather than modern styles. His music was therefore not favoured by music critics and was sometimes labelled as commercial, but nevertheless it was widely appreciated. Burgon saw his work in film and television as subsidising his passion for, and ability to devote time to what he called his "serious work" for concert. (Perhaps his most noted piece is his Nunc dimittis, which was composed in 1979 for use in the television series, Tinker Tailor Soldier Spy.)

He married Janice Elizabeth Garwood in 1963 and had a son, Matthew and a daughter, Hannah. They were separated in 1970 and the marriage was dissolved in 1975. In 1992 he married Jacqueline Kroft, a Canadian pianist and singer/songwriter; they had a son, Daniel.

He was a keen cricketer and wrote detective novels in his spare time. Burgon died on 21 September 2010 after a short illness.

== Career highlights ==
- 1974 – ballet The Calm for London Contemporary Dance Theatre, first of many dance scores.
- 1976 – first breakthrough, with Requiem at the Three Choirs Festival.
- 1979 – Ivor Novello Award for score of BBC television series Tinker Tailor Soldier Spy.
- 1981 – Ivor Novello Award for score of Granada television series Brideshead Revisited.
- 1997 – premiere of City Adventures, percussion concerto for Evelyn Glennie at BBC Proms.
- 2001 – wrote Heavenly Things, commissioned by the BBC for baritone Christopher Maltman.

== Selected works ==
=== Stage ===
- The Golden Fish, ballet (1964)
- Joan of Arc, music drama for 2 sopranos, tenor, baritone, narrator, flute, cello, harp and percussion (1970)
- The Calm, ballet (1974)
- The Fall of Lucifer, music drama in 2 acts for soloists, chorus and five instruments (1974)
- Goldberg's Dream (Running Figures), ballet (1975)
- Step at a Time, ballet (1976)
- Songs, Lamentations and Praises, ballet (1979)
- Orpheus, music drama (1982)
- Mass, ballet for chorus, 4 trombones and percussionist (playing piano) (1984)
- Macbeth, incidental music (1986)
- Murder in the Cathedral, incidental music (1987)
- Blood Wedding, incidental music (1988)
- The Trial of Prometheus, ballet (1988)
- Hard Times, opera (1991); after the novel by Charles Dickens
- Nicholas Nickleby, incidental music for the play by Charles Dickens (2001)

=== Orchestral ===
- Concerto for string orchestra (1963)
- Gending for brass, woodwind, celesta and percussion (1968)
- Alleluia Nativitas (1970)
- Cantus Alleluia (1973)
- Brideshead Variations (1982)
- Suite from The Chronicles of Narnia (1991)
- Suite from Bleak House (1991)
- Suite from Martin Chuzzlewit (1994)
- Suite from Testament of Youth (1991)
- A Different Dawn for celesta, percussion and string orchestra (1999)
- Industrial Dreams (2006)

=== Brass band ===
- Narnia Suite (1998)
- Paradise Dances (1994)

=== Concertante ===
- Trumpet Concerto: The Turning World for trumpet, string orchestra and percussion (1993)
- City Adventures, concerto for percussion and orchestra (1996)
- Piano Concerto (1997)
- The Calm, concerto for violin, trumpet, harp and string orchestra (1974, 2004); arranged for the ballet The Calm
- Concerto for cello and chamber orchestra (2007)
- Concerto Ghosts of the Dance for viola and orchestra (2008)
- On the Street for alto saxophone and wind orchestra (2009)

=== Chamber music ===
- Fanfares and Variants for 2 trumpets and 2 trombones (1969)
- Lullaby and Aubade for trumpet and piano (1972)
- Gloria for piccolo, oboe, clarinet, horn, cello and piano (1973)
- Three Nocturnes for harp solo (1974)
- Four Guitars for 4 guitars (1977)
- Four Horns for 4 horns (1977)
- Six Studies for cello solo (1980); adapted for viola solo (2000); composed for Julian Lloyd Webber
- Little Missenden Variation for English horn, clarinet, bassoon and horn (1984)
- Fanfare for horns, trumpets, trombones and tuba (1985)
- The Wanderer for clarinet and string quartet (1997–1998)
- String Quartet (1999)
- On The Street for brass quartet (1999)
- Minterne Dances for flute, clarinet, string quartet and harp (2009)

=== Piano ===
- Theme from Brideshead Revisited (1982)
- Aslan's Theme from The Chronicles of Narnia (1988)
- Waiting, 9 Easy Pieces (1998)

=== Vocal ===
- Cantata on Mediaeval Latin Texts for countertenor, flute, oboe and bassoon (1964)
- Acquainted with Night for countertenor, harp, timpani and string orchestra (1965)
- Hymn to Venus for mezzo-soprano and piano (1966)
- Five Sonnets or John Donne for soprano, mezzo-soprano, flute, oboe, clarinet (bass clarinet), horn, cello, piano and timpani (1967)
- Songs of Mary for mezzo-soprano, viola and piano (1970)
- At the Round Earth's Imagined Corners for soprano and organ, with optional trumpet (1971); words by John Donne
- Worldës Blissë for countertenor and oboe (1971)
- Threnody for tenor, piano and amplified harpsichord (1971)
- This Endris Night for tenor, female chorus, brass ensemble and timpani (1972)
- This Ean Night for 2 countertenors (1972)
- Dira vi amores terror for countertenor solo (1973)
- Canciones del Alma for 2 countertenors (or mezzo-sopranos) and 13 solo strings (1975)
- Magnificat and Nunc Dimittis (1979)
- Nunc Dimittis (1979)
- The World Again for soprano and orchestra (1983)
- Lunar Beauty for medium voice and guitar (or lute) (1986)
- Title Divine for soprano and orchestra (1986)
- Nearing the Upper Air for countertenor, 2 recorders, cello and harpsichord (1988)
- The Fire of Heaven (setting of Traherne's poetry)
- Title Divine (orchestral song cycle) (1987)
- First Was the World for countertenor (or mezzo-soprano), mixed chorus and orchestra (1994); words by Andrew Marvell
- A Vision, Song Cycle for tenor and string orchestra (1991); poems by John Clare
- Almost Peace, Three Songs to Poems by Emily Dickinson for soprano and chamber ensemble (1995)
- Merciless Beauty for countertenor and orchestra (1996); poems by Anonymous, Geoffrey Chaucer, William Blake and Kit Wright
- Heavenly Things for medium voice and piano (2000)
- The Road of Love for soprano and string quartet (2006)

=== Choral ===
- Three Elegies for mixed chorus (1964)
- Short Mass for mixed chorus (1965)
- Farewell Earth's Bliss for 6 solo voices (1966)
- Three Carols for mixed chorus (1967)
- Two Hymns to Mary for mixed chorus (1967, 1969)
- Think on Dredful Domesday for soprano, mixed chorus and orchestra (1969)
- And There was War in Heaven for boys (or soprano) chorus and organ (1970)
- Five Alleluias for 6 solo voices (1970)
- Golden Eternity for mixed chorus, harp and piano (1970)
- Mai Hamama for 6 solo voices (1970)
- A Prayer to the Trinity for mixed chorus (1972)
- Sleep for 5 solo voices (1973)
- The Fire of Heaven for triple chorus (1973)
- Noche Oscura for 6 solo voices (1974)
- Dos Coros for 12 solo voices (1975)
- Requiem for soprano, countertenor (or mezzo-soprano), tenor, mixed chorus and orchestra (1976)
- This World From for mixed chorus and organ (1979)
- Veni Spiritus for soprano, baritone, mixed chorus and orchestra (1979)
- Laudate Dominum for mixed chorus and organ (1980)
- Hymn to St. Thomas of Hereford for mixed chorus and orchestra (1981); alternate version with organ and optional timpani
- But Have Been Found Again for double mixed chorus (1983)
- A God and Yet a Man for double mixed chorus (1984)
- Revelations for soloists and chorus (1984)
- The Names of the Hare for mixed chorus (1985)
- The Song of the Creatures for mixed chorus and organ (1987)
- Prayer to St. Richard for mixed chorus (1989)
- Songs of the Creation for mixed chorus and organ (1989)
- Five Love Songs for mixed chorus (1992)
- In a Dark Time for mixed chorus (1992)
- The First World for mixed chorus (1992)
- Christ's Love 4 Pieces to Middle English texts for mixed chorus (2000)
- Magic Words, 6 Pieces to Inuitt texts for mixed chorus, percussion (played by chorus) (2000)
- Alleluia Psallat for mixed chorus and orchestra (2002)
- Te Deum for mixed chorus and organ (2002)
- Three Mysteries for mixed chorus and chamber orchestra (2003)
- Of Flowers and Emeralds Sheen, Anthem for mixed chorus (2004); poem by St. John of the Cross
- Becket Mass for mixed chorus and organ (2005)
- Come Let Us Pity Death for mixed chorus, organ and trumpet (optional) (2005)
- Death Be Not Proud for mixed chorus, organ and trumpet (optional) (2005)
- Adam lay Ybounden for SSAA chorus and organ (2008)

=== Film scores ===
- Monty Python's Life of Brian (1979)
- The Dogs of War (1981)
- Turtle Diary (1985)
- Robin Hood (1991)
- Cider with Rosie (1998)

=== Television scores ===
- The Letter (1969)
- The Treasure of Abbot Thomas (1974)
- Doctor Who: Terror of the Zygons (1975)
- Doctor Who: The Seeds of Doom (1976)
- As You Like It (1978)
- Testament of Youth (1979)
- Tinker, Tailor, Soldier, Spy (1979)
- Brideshead Revisited (1981)
- How Many Miles to Babylon? (1982)
- Soft Targets (1982)
- Z for Zachariah (1984)
- Bewitched (1985)
- Bleak House (1985)
- The Death of a Heart (1985)
- The Happy Valley (1987)
- Chronicles of Narnia

The Lion, the Witch and the Wardrobe (1988)
Prince Caspian & The Voyage of the Dawn Treader (1989)
The Silver Chair (1990)

- Children of the North (1991)
- A Foreign Field (1993)
- Martin Chuzzlewit (1994)
- Silent Witness (1996) series 1 only. [From series 2 the opening titles music, prominently featuring contralto vocals, was composed by John Harle
- Turning World (1996)
- When Trumpets Fade (1998)
- Ghost Stories for Christmas (2000)
- Longitude (2000)
- The Forsyte Saga (2002–2003)
- Island at War (2004)
