= Sheila Dunn =

English actress (1940–2004)

- Born: Sheila Mary Dunn; 11 April 1940; Wolverhampton, England
- Died: 3 March 2004 (aged 63); Twickenham, Middlesex, England
- Occupation: Actor
- Spouse: Douglas Camfield (m. 1965; died 1984)
- Children: 1

Sheila Mary Dunn (11 April 1940 – 3 March 2004) was an actress who worked both on television and in the theatre. She also performed under her married name, Sheila Camfield.

== Profile ==
Dunn's father was Bill Dunn, a former ICI chairman who invented the bullet-proof engine for the Spitfire.

She appeared in two editions of The Wednesday Play in the early part of her career. In 1965 she married director Douglas Camfield, after which she appeared in a number of drama series and serials directed by him, including Shoestring, Target, and three Doctor Who serials: The Daleks' Master Plan (1965), The Invasion (1968) and Inferno (1970).

She also appeared in episodes of Z-Cars, The Bill, Kessler and Mistress of Hardwick.

Her most prolific role in the latter stages of her career was in the Harry Hill TV series in which she played Harry's mother.

For over 25 years she worked and performed for the Richmond Shakespeare Society in Twickenham, including in the box office and behind the bar, as well as on stage.

She died peacefully at her home in Twickenham on 3 March 2004. Her funeral was held on 15 March at Mortlake Crematorium, with a celebration of her life held afterwards at the Mary Wallace Theatre.
