= The Seeds of Doom =

085 – The Seeds of Doom
- Doctor Who serial

Cast
- Doctor: Tom Baker – Fourth Doctor
- Companion: Elisabeth Sladen – Sarah Jane Smith
- Others: Tony Beckley – Harrison Chase; Kenneth Gilbert – Richard Dunbar; Michael Barrington – Sir Colin Thackeray; John Challis – Scorby; Mark Jones – Arnold Keeler/Krynoid Voice; Seymour Green – Hargreaves; Michael McStay – Derek Moberley; Hubert Rees – John Stevenson; John Gleeson – Charles Winlett; Sylvia Coleridge – Amelia Ducat; John Acheson – Major Beresford; Ray Barron – Sergeant Henderson; Alan Chuntz – Chauffeur; David Masterman – Guard Leader; Harry Fielder – Guard; Ian Fairbairn – Doctor Chester

Production
- Directed by: Douglas Camfield
- Written by: Robert Banks Stewart
- Script editor: Robert Holmes
- Produced by: Philip Hinchcliffe
- Executive producer: None
- Music by: Geoffrey Burgon
- Production code: 4L
- Series: Season 13
- Running time: 6 episodes, 25 minutes each
- First broadcast: 31 January 1976
- Last broadcast: 6 March 1976

Chronology
| ← Preceded by The Brain of Morbius | Followed by → The Masque of Mandragora |

The Seeds of Doom is the sixth and final serial of the 13th season of the British science fiction television series Doctor Who, which was first broadcast in six weekly parts on BBC1 from 31 January to 6 March 1976.

In the serial, the Fourth Doctor (Tom Baker) agrees to go on a final mission in his role as UNIT's scientific advisor to investigate a mysterious pod found in the Antarctic. However, the crazed millionaire and plant collector Harrison Chase (Tony Beckley) is also interested, and has sent his violent henchman Scorby (John Challis) and the botanist Arnold Keeler (Mark Jones) to acquire the malignant alien plant for his personal collection.

== Plot ==
In Antarctica, an expedition consisting of John Stevenson, Derek Moberley, and Charles Winlett discover an unknown seed pod in the permafrost, buried at a layer that predates any known form of plant life. While Winlett is examining the pod, it suddenly splits open and releases a tendril that attaches itself to Winlett's arm, causing his body to be rapidly overtaken with plant growths. The Doctor and Sarah Jane arrive to help, and the Doctor identifies the pod that infected Winlett as being a Krynoid, an extremely dangerous alien plant species with the potential to destroy all animal life on Earth; furthermore, a second pod is found near where the first one was discovered. Lacking any better ideas, the Doctor suggests amputating Winlett's arm in the hope that it might slow the infection down, but before they have the chance to do so Winlett fully transforms into a Krynoid and kills Moberley, and later Stevenson.

Meanwhile, reclusive plant-obsessed millionaire Harrison Chase has got word of the mysterious seed pod, and sends his henchmen Scorby and Keeler to obtain it. While they're too late to obtain the first pod, they manage to steal the second one. Over Keeler's objections, Scorby sets a bomb to destroy the entire base. The Krynoid that was once Winlett is killed in the resulting blast, but the Doctor and Sarah barely survive.

Returning to England, the Doctor and Sarah infiltrate Chase's estate with the help of eccentric artist Amelia Ducat, but they are both captured by Scorby. Chase decides to use Sarah as a guinea pig for the second Krynoid pod, but the Doctor escapes and rescues Sarah. In the resulting confusion, the pod opens and infects Keeler. The warmer British climate causes Keeler to start transforming much more rapidly than Winlett did, and Chase further accelerates the process by feeding him raw meat. By the following morning the new Krynoid has grown to the size of a house and is able to take over plants and have them strangle people to death, as well as causing Chase to fall under its influence, forcing a reluctant Scorby to join forces with the Doctor and Sarah.

The Doctor is able to call in UNIT for help, and after their initial efforts fail, the Doctor determines that the Krynoid, which is now bigger than Chase's mansion, will soon release a huge quantity of the type of pods that infected Winlett and Keeler, dooming all animal life on Earth. Running out of time, the Doctor tells UNIT to completely destroy the Krynoid and the mansion with an aerial barrage, regardless of any danger to anyone inside. Scorby panics and tries to flee, resulting in his being dragged into a lake and drowned by Krynoid-controlled plants, while Chase tries to feed Sarah into an industrial mulching machine, only to fall victim to the machine himself when the Doctor arrives and rescues Sarah. The Doctor and Sarah just barely escape from the mansion before it and the Krynoid are completely destroyed. Needing a break after their latest near-death experience, the Doctor and Sarah try to travel to a tropical planet in the TARDIS, only to instead find themselves back in Antarctica.

== Production ==
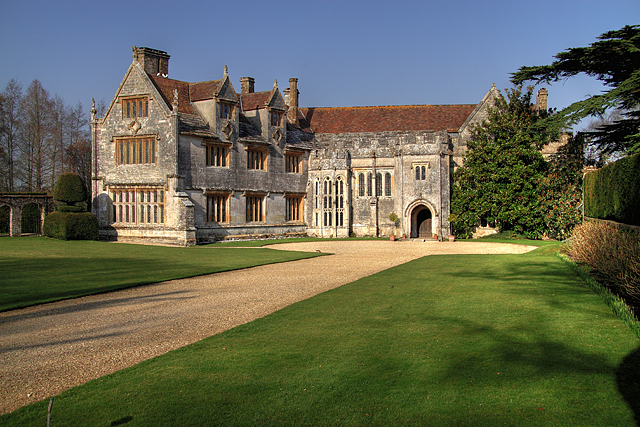
Location filming took place at Athelhampton House in Dorset

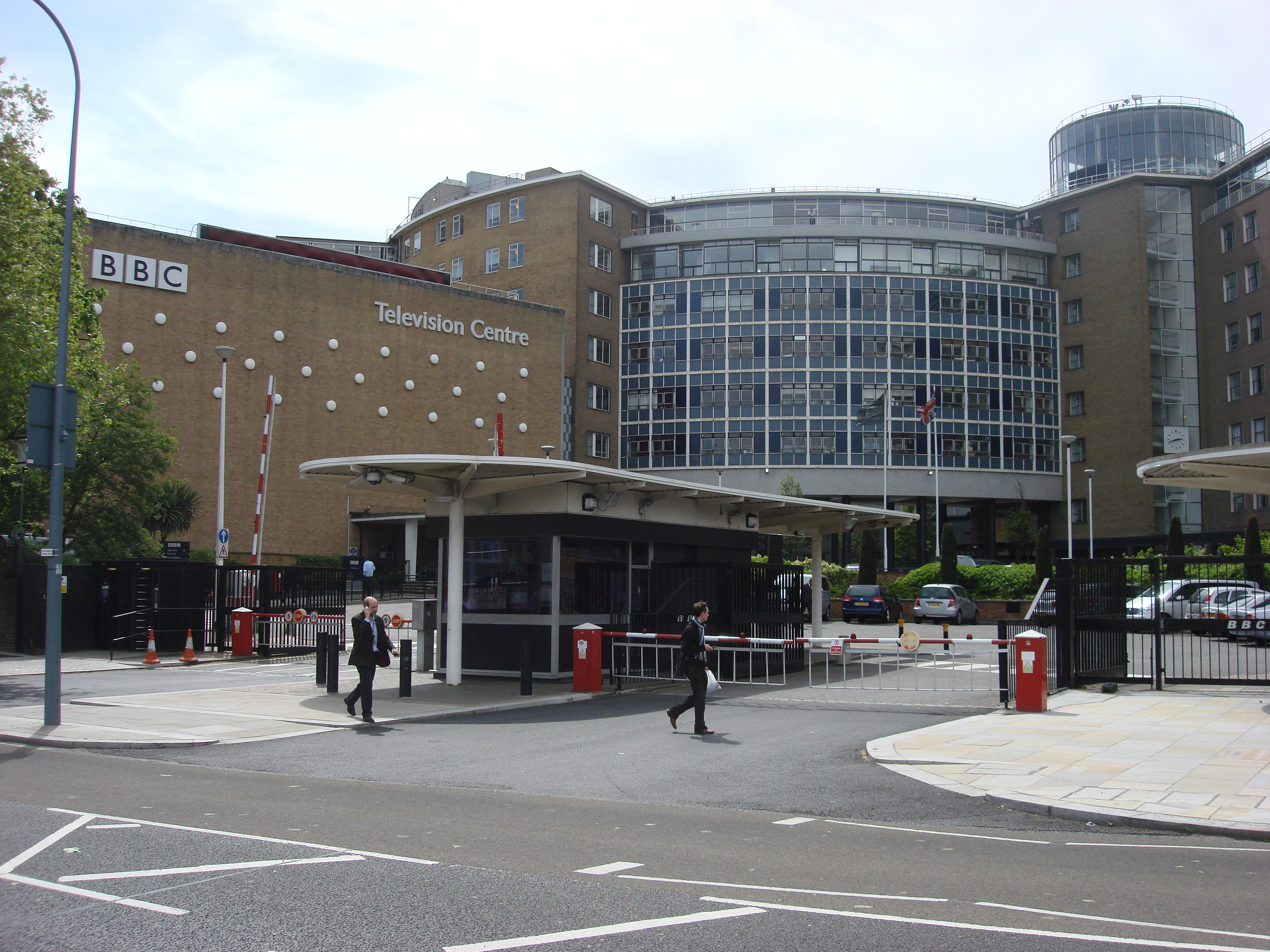
BBC Television Centre in London was used as the World Ecology Bureau

=== Writing ===
The serial was written by established television writer Robert Banks Stewart, who was influenced in the writing of this ecological tale of rampant flora by his home abutting Kew Gardens as well as his familial connection to botanist Joseph Banks. The Doctor's dialogue with Amelia Ducat about the car boot and model is a homage to Oscar Wilde's The Importance of Being Earnest. Scorby quotes Voltaire's line "when it is a question of money, everybody is of the same religion", but the Doctor attributes it to Franklin Pierce Adams.

=== Filming ===
Location shooting took place at Athelhampton Hall in Dorset for the scenes at Harrison Chase's estate, while the Antarctica scenes were recorded in a quarry in Buckland, Surrey. BBC Television Centre in White City, London served as the location for the World Ecology Centre.

This is the third of four serials of the programme to have all of its exterior location scenes shot on Outside Broadcast (OB) videotape rather than film before the official switchover in 1986; the previous two were Robot (1974) and The Sontaran Experiment (1975), and later The Stones of Blood (1978).

After his long association with Doctor Who, this was the last story to be directed by Douglas Camfield.

== Broadcast and reception ==
| Episode | Title | Run time | Original release date | UK viewers (millions) |
|---|---|---|---|---|
| 1 | "Part One" | 24:10 | 31 January 1976 | 11.4 |
| 2 | "Part Two" | 24:09 | 7 February 1976 | 11.4 |
| 3 | "Part Three" | 24:51 | 14 February 1976 | 10.3 |
| 4 | "Part Four" | 24:26 | 21 February 1976 | 11.1 |
| 5 | "Part Five" | 25:06 | 28 February 1976 | 9.9 |
| 6 | "Part Six" | 21:51 | 6 March 1976 | 11.5 |

The Seeds of Doom was one of the Doctor Who serials which drew criticism from Mary Whitehouse for violent imagery. She wrote, "Strangulation – by hand, by claw, by obscene vegetable matter – is the latest gimmick, sufficiently close up so they get the point. And just for a little variety show the children how to make a Molotov Cocktail."

In The Discontinuity Guide, Paul Cornell, Martin Day, and Keith Topping described the serial as "an Avengers episode in disguise" and called it "another gem, and one much benefitting from an excellent performance from Tony Beckley as Harrison Chase". In The Television Companion (1998), David J. Howe and Stephen James Walker praised how the story was split between two settings and the monster in general, though they felt some aspects of the Krynoid were "rubbish". They wrote that the only real disappointment was UNIT, which contained none of the old characters and as a result "[came] across as a faceless and characterless bunch whose sole function in the story is to resolve the situation".

In 2010, Mark Braxton of Radio Times awarded it five stars out of five, describing The Seeds of Doom as "a rich, classy serving, with plenty of meat accompanying the vegetables" and arguing that "the archive-raiding of the Holmes/Hinchcliffe era reaches its zenith here." He praised Baker, the guest actors and their characters. However, he acknowledged that it was "an abnormally violent outing" and believed that the plot contained a "giant crevasse" in that "it takes a ridiculous amount of time for the Doctor et al to know how to tackle the Keeler-Krynoid, having seemingly forgotten that the Winlett-Krynoid was killed by an explosion". The A.V. Club reviewer Christopher Bahn said that the serial was "one of the greats" of the era, particularly praising the pacing and Baker's performance.

DVD Talk's Ian Jane gave The Seeds of Doom four out of five stars, calling the script "a good one". Ian Berriman of SFX gave the story five out of five stars, writing, "Often bleakly grotesque, blessed with an eerie, mournful score and shot with real brio, this is a rare Who six-parter that you can consume in one sitting, with nary a moment of boredom." He also was positive towards the performances of Beckley and Baker. In 2018, The Daily Telegraph ranked The Seeds of Doom at number 14 in "the 56 greatest stories and episodes", arguing that it was "probably the high-water mark of the series as an action adventure programme" and "the closest it ever got to a Bond movie", with an "interesting concept, good direction, memorable performances, action and adventure".

== Commercial releases ==
=== In print ===
Doctor Who and the Seeds of Doom
- Author: Philip Hinchcliffe
- Cover artist: Chris Achilleos
- Series: Doctor Who book: Target novelisations
- Release number: 55
- Publisher: Target Books
- Publication date: 17 February 1977
- ISBN: 0-426-11658-5

A novelisation of this serial, written by Philip Hinchcliffe, was published by Target Books in February 1977. A slightly "Americanized" version of Hinchcliffe's novel was released as #10 in the Pinnacle Books series in March 1980 with a foreword by Harlan Ellison and a cover illustration by David Mann. An audiobook of the Target novelisation was released on 5 September 2019 by BBC Audio, read by Michael Kilgarriff.

=== Home media ===
The Seeds of Doom was released on a double VHS in 1994 in the United Kingdom. In North America it was released as a single VHS. The story was released on DVD on 25 October 2010 in the United Kingdom, and on 8 March 2011 in the United States. Music from this serial was released on the CD Doctor Who: Terror of the Zygons. This serial was also released as part of the Doctor Who DVD Files in Issue 120 on 7 August 2013.

=== Soundtrack ===
Doctor Who: Terror of the Zygons

Soundtrack album by Geoffrey Burgon
- Released: 24 January 2000
- Genre: Soundtrack
- Length: 78:25
- Label: BBC Music
- Producer: Mark Ayres

Doctor Who soundtrack chronology
| Original Soundtrack Recording (1997) | Terror of the Zygons (2000) | Doctor Who at the BBC Radiophonic Workshop Volume 1: The Early Years 1963–1969 (2000) |

Geoffrey Burgon's music for his Doctor Who serials Terror of the Zygons and The Seeds of Doom were released on CD by BBC Music on 24 January 2000. The CD was sourced from the composer's own copies of the score, recorded at a low speed, resulting in lower fidelity.

==== Track listing ====
All music is composed by Geoffrey Burgon, unless otherwise noted.

| No. | Title | Story | Length |
|---|---|---|---|
| 1. | "Doctor Who Opening Title Theme" (Ron Grainer, realised by Delia Derbyshire) | various | 0:32 |
| 2. | "The Destruction of Charlie Rig" | Terror of the Zygons | 0:41 |
| 3. | "A Landing in Scotland" | Terror of the Zygons | 1:22 |
| 4. | "Murder and Mystery on Tulloch Moor" | Terror of the Zygons | 3:28 |
| 5. | "Wreckage" | Terror of the Zygons | 1:18 |
| 6. | "The Zygons Attack" | Terror of the Zygons | 0:51 |
| 7. | "Decompression" | Terror of the Zygons | 1:09 |
| 8. | "The Zygons' Ultimate Weapon" | Terror of the Zygons | 1:24 |
| 9. | "Trance" | Terror of the Zygons | 0:50 |
| 10. | "False Harry" | Terror of the Zygons | 3:59 |
| 11. | "Monster on the Moor" | Terror of the Zygons | 3:27 |
| 12. | "Death at the Inn"/"Hunt for a Zygon" | Terror of the Zygons | 2:18 |
| 13. | "The Secret of Forgill Castle" | Terror of the Zygons | 1:44 |
| 14. | "Ascent and Descent" | Terror of the Zygons | 1:28 |
| 15. | "A Call from the Prime Minister" | Terror of the Zygons | 0:26 |
| 16. | "To London"/"Death of Broton" | Terror of the Zygons | 2:55 |
| 17. | "The Monster Goes Home" | Terror of the Zygons | 1:10 |
| 18. | "Return Ticket" | Terror of the Zygons | 0:23 |
| 19. | "Antarctica: The First pod" | The Seeds of Doom | 2:20 |
| 20. | "It's Growing!" | The Seeds of Doom | 1:02 |
| 21. | "Harrison Chase" | The Seeds of Doom | 0:42 |
| 22. | "The Pod Opens" | The Seeds of Doom | 1:12 |
| 23. | "The Galactic Weed" | The Seeds of Doom | 2:00 |
| 24. | "The Creature Attacks" | The Seeds of Doom | 0:39 |
| 25. | "A Plan for Murder"/"Hunt in the Snow" | The Seeds of Doom | 2:47 |
| 26. | "Sabotage" | The Seeds of Doom | 1:40 |
| 27. | "Chase Receives the Second Pod" | The Seeds of Doom | 1:08 |
| 28. | "The Chauffeur Takes a Detour" | The Seeds of Doom | 1:28 |
| 29. | "A Visit to Harrison Chase" | The Seeds of Doom | 2:11 |
| 30. | "The Hymn of the Plants"/"Floriana Requiem" | The Seeds of Doom | 1:22 |
| 31. | "Escape and Recapture" | The Seeds of Doom | 2:37 |
| 32. | "The Second Pod Bursts" | The Seeds of Doom | 0:51 |
| 33. | "Keeler's Transformation Begins" | The Seeds of Doom | 0:56 |
| 34. | "The Composter" | The Seeds of Doom | 1:05 |
| 35. | "The Nurturing of Keeler" | The Seeds of Doom | 4:33 |
| 36. | "Get Dunbar!"/"Krynoid on the Loose" | The Seeds of Doom | 2:54 |
| 37. | "Amelia Ducat's Theme" | The Seeds of Doom | 0:45 |
| 38. | "Molotov Cocktail" | The Seeds of Doom | 1:26 |
| 39. | "The Plants Must Win" | The Seeds of Doom | 2:28 |
| 40. | "The Plants Attack" | The Seeds of Doom | 2:54 |
| 41. | "Laser Fire" | The Seeds of Doom | 1:26 |
| 42. | "Trapped" | The Seeds of Doom | 2:13 |
| 43. | "The Final Assault" | The Seeds of Doom | 3:51 |
| 44. | "Doctor Who Closing Title Theme" (Ron Grainer realised by Delia Derbyshire) | various | 0:55 |
| Total length: | | | 76:50 |

== Sources ==
- Ainsworth, John (2015). "Doctor Who - The Complete History: Genesis of the Daleks, Revenge of the Cybermen and Terror of the Zygons". Doctor Who - The Complete History. Vol. 23. Panini Comics.
