= The Android Invasion =

083 – The Android Invasion
- Doctor Who serial

Cast
- Doctor: Tom Baker – Fourth Doctor
- Companion: Elisabeth Sladen – Sarah Jane Smith
- Others: Ian Marter – Harry Sullivan; John Levene – RSM Benton; Milton Johns – Guy Crayford; Martin Friend – Styggron; Roy Skelton – Chedaki; Stuart Fell – Kraal; Peter Welch – Morgan; Max Faulkner – Corporal Adams; Dave Carter – Grierson; Patrick Newell – Colonel Faraday; Hugh Lund – Matthews; Heather Emmanuel – Tessa

Production
- Directed by: Barry Letts
- Written by: Terry Nation
- Script editor: Robert Holmes
- Produced by: Philip Hinchcliffe
- Executive producer: None
- Music by: Dudley Simpson
- Production code: 4J
- Series: Season 13
- Running time: 4 episodes, 25 minutes each
- First broadcast: 22 November 1975
- Last broadcast: 13 December 1975

Chronology
← Preceded by Pyramids of Mars	Followed by → The Brain of Morbius

The Android Invasion is the fourth serial of the thirteenth season of the British science fiction television series Doctor Who, which was first broadcast in four weekly parts on BBC1 from 22 November to 13 December 1975.

The serial is set on the planet Oseidon and in England. In the serial, the alien race the Kraals plot to wipe out humanity with a virus to prepare the Earth for their invasion.

The serial was directed by former series producer Barry Letts and written by Terry Nation — his first Doctor Who script for eleven years not to feature his creations, the Daleks. The serial marks the last appearances in the programme of both John Levene in his recurring role as Sergeant Benton and also of Ian Marter, who makes a guest appearance as previous companion Harry Sullivan.

== Plot ==
In the village of Devesham, the Doctor and Sarah Jane meet a group of humanoid robots in white suits and opaque helmets, who shoot at them with their index fingers. The Doctor and Sarah Jane flee to a pub, where the villagers wait motionless until the clock strikes, when they suddenly come to life, acting normally.

The Doctor finds his way to the local Space Defence Station and introduces himself to Senior Defence Astronaut Guy Crayford, who places the Doctor in a cell. It is revealed that Crayford is working for Styggron, the leader of an alien race called the Kraal. Sarah frees the Doctor and they escape, but they become separated and Sarah is captured. Styggron tells Crayford to locate, but not seize, the Doctor.

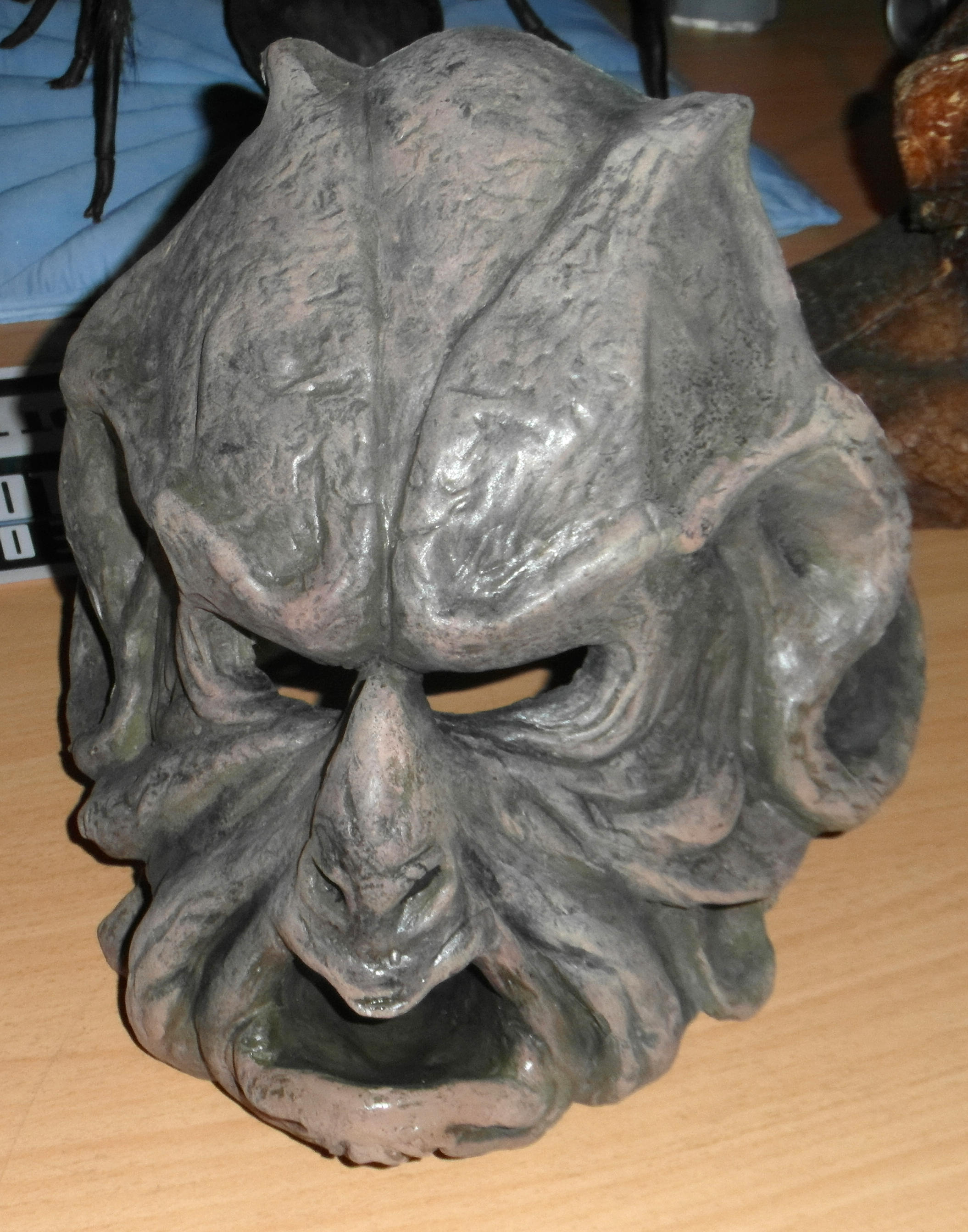
The mask of Styggron at the National Space Centre

The Doctor returns to the village and encounters an android copy of Sarah Jane, sent to test his knowledge and abilities. The real Sarah is kept alive so Styggron can test the virus he intends to use on Earth. The Doctor escapes from the android but is recaptured and locked up with the real Sarah. The Doctor explains that the Kraal planet will soon be uninhabitable due to high levels of radiation, so the Kraal plan to eradicate humanity and take over Earth. The duplicated village was a training ground. Crayford explains that he is helping the Kraals because they rescued him and reconstructed his body, while Earth left him for dead.

Sarah and the Doctor escape aboard Crayford's rocket and travel to Earth to warn the real defence station while being followed by android duplicates of themselves. They land separately on Earth in their pods, and Sarah finds the TARDIS in the woods. When Crayford's rocket lands, Colonel Faraday and Harry Sullivan head there, not knowing that Styggron is there with Crayford. The real Doctor enters the Station and meets Benton, who tells him where Harry and Faraday are. The Doctor contacts them by radio and urges them not to enter the rocket.

The real Doctor explains the Kraal invasion to Faraday and Sullivan, but they have been replaced. The android Doctor enters and threatens the Doctor with a gun but he escapes. After dodging pursuit, the Doctor makes his way back to the Space Defence Station's control room, where he had given a technician instructions to prepare a device that would disable the androids. The android Doctor intervenes and holds the Doctor at gunpoint, preventing him from activating the device, but Crayford enters, saying that Styggron promised no killing. The real Doctor tells him that the Kraal did not reconstruct him but merely brainwashed him. Realising the truth, Crayford rushes out, distracting the android long enough for the Doctor to make his move. In the struggle, the Doctor activates the device, which jams all the androids in mid-step.

Meanwhile, Crayford attacks Styggron on his ship. The two grapple and Styggron shoots Crayford. The Doctor enters and defeats Styggron, using his reprogrammed duplicate android as a distraction.

== Production ==
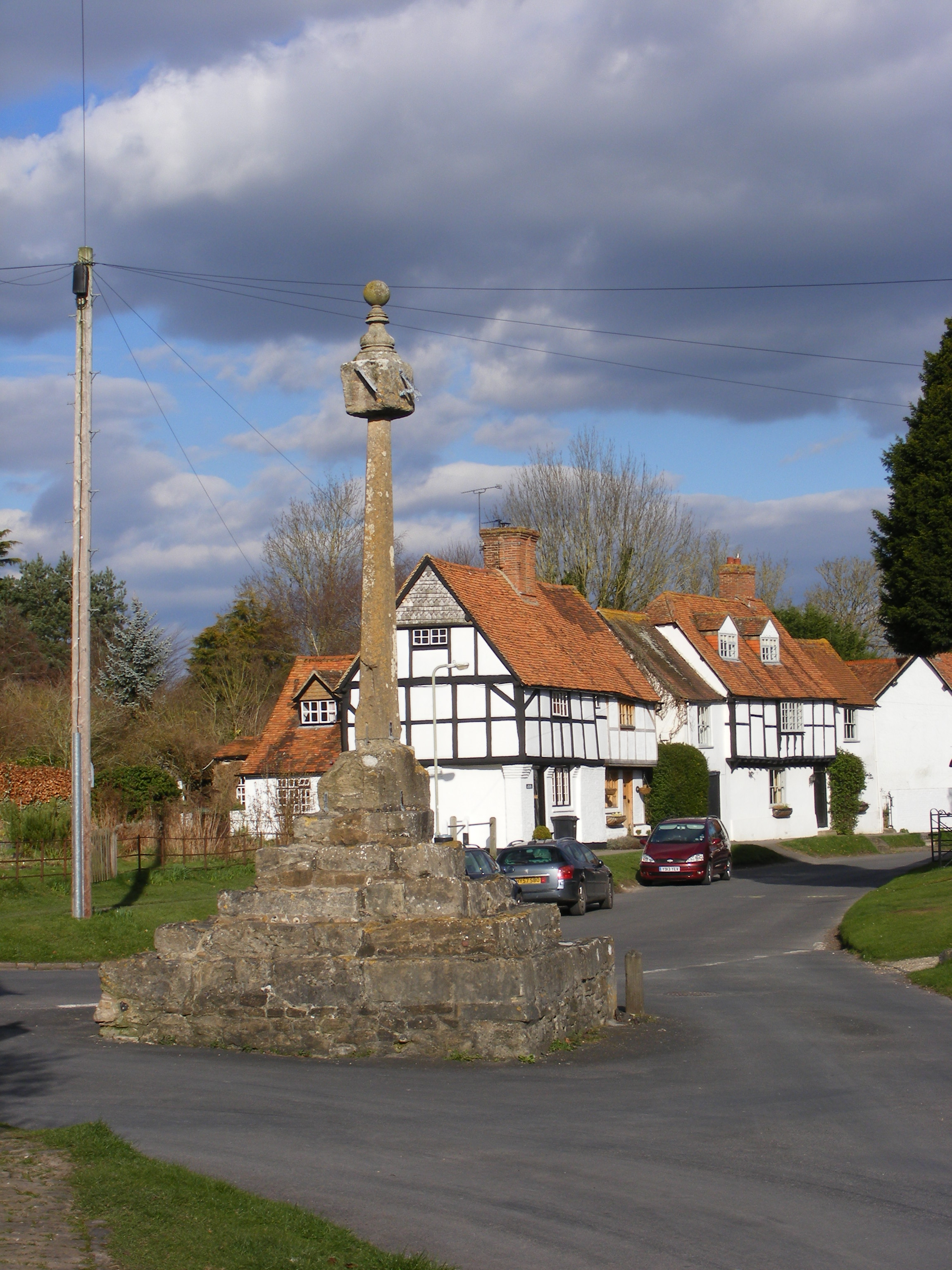
East Hagbourne, Oxfordshire, used as the location for the village of Devesham

The story was influenced by the film Invasion of the Body Snatchers (1956) and would be the last Terry Nation script for Doctor Who for four years until his final script for the series, Destiny of the Daleks (1979). This was the first script by Nation since The Keys of Marinus (1964) that did not feature the Daleks.

Location filming for the Kraal-replicated village of Devesham took place in East Hagbourne, Oxfordshire, a few miles from Didcot. Scenes outside the Space Defence Station were filmed at the National Radiological Protection Board at nearby Harwell.

=== Cast notes ===
Nicholas Courtney was unavailable to play Lethbridge-Stewart, so his character was rewritten as Colonel Faraday. Ian Marter would continue his acting career and go on to write several Doctor Who novelisations, an original novel featuring Harry and an unused screenplay, Doctor Who Meets Scratchman, the last with Tom Baker. He died in 1986 from diabetes-related health complications.

Only three Kraals are seen throughout the story. Styggron was played by Martin Friend. Marshal Chedaki was played by Roy Skelton. The silent Kraal underling that appears in one scene was played by the series' long-time stuntman Stuart Fell. Milton Johns had appeared as Benik in The Enemy of the World (1967–68), also directed by Barry Letts. His next appearance in Doctor Who would be as Castellan Kelner in The Invasion of Time (1978).

== Broadcast and reception ==
Episode	Title	Run time	Original release date	UK viewers (millions)
1	"Part One"	24:21	22 November 1975	11.9
2	"Part Two"	24:30	29 November 1975	11.3
3	"Part Three"	24:50	6 December 1975	12.1
4	"Part Four"	24:30	13 December 1975	11.4

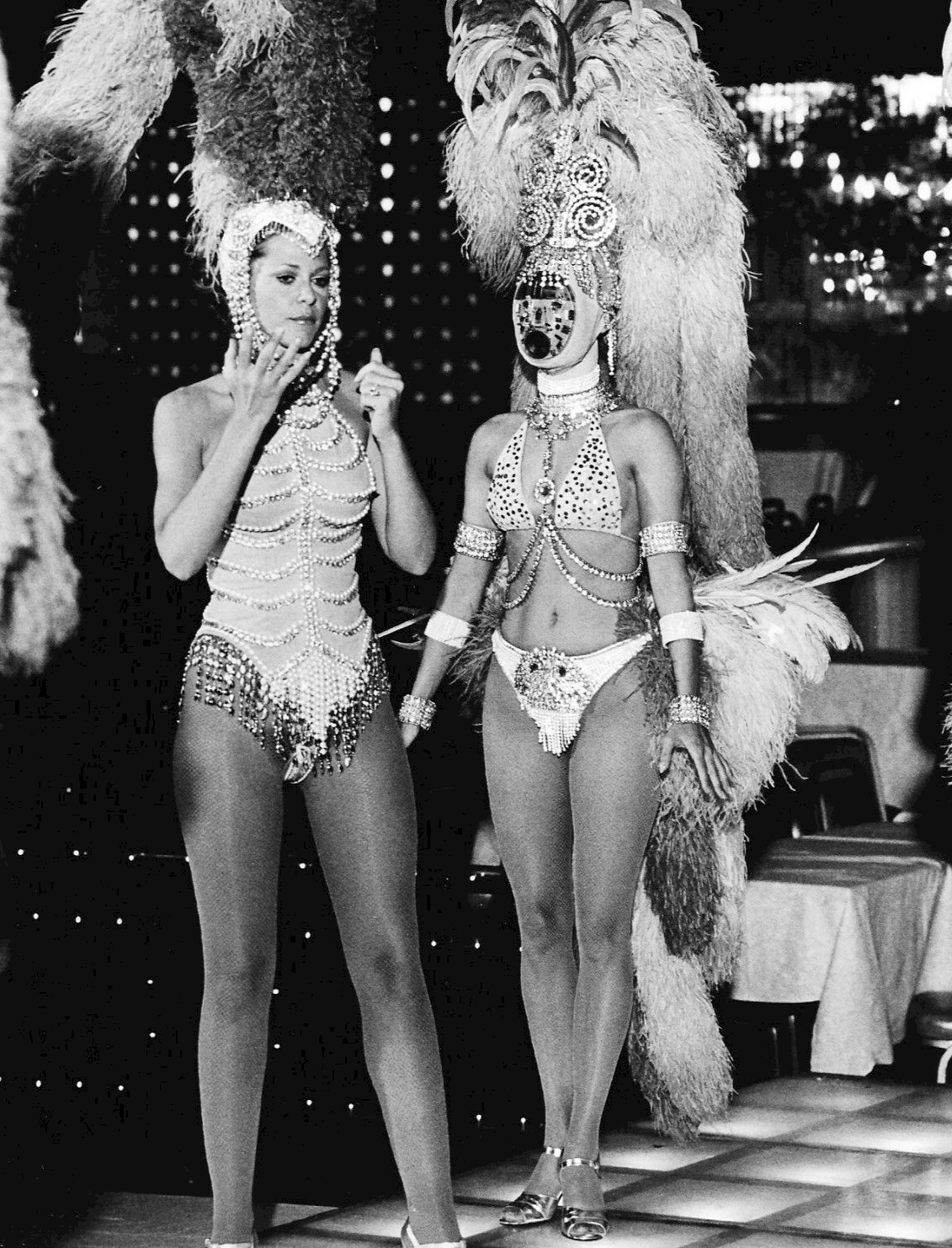
The depiction of androids was similar to other television series of the period, such as The Bionic Woman.

Kenneth Williams briefly mentioned viewing episode two of this story in his diaries, writing on 29 November 1975, "Doctor Who gets more and more silly." Paul Cornell, Martin Day, and Keith Topping gave the serial a negative review in The Discontinuity Guide (1995), writing that it was "stupid, tiresome and very irritating". In The Television Companion (1998), David J Howe and Stephen James Walker reported that the serial had a mixed reception. They wrote that the Kraals were "somewhat unoriginal but otherwise reasonable addition", with average effects and the actors making the most of it. They also praised the direction but wrote that the plot was too far-fetched. In 2010, Mark Braxton of Radio Times awarded it two stars out of five, writing that The Android Invasion was the weak link in the season. He criticised the plotting and use of UNIT but was more positive towards the way the story played around with the android duplicates of characters. DVD Talk's Ian Jane gave the serial three-and-a-half out of five stars, saying that it "may not be the deepest or for that matter the most original of stories told in the series but it's a fun tale that breezes by at a good pace". He praised the location work and the androids and white robots. SFX reviewer Ian Berriman also criticised the far-fetched plot, but said that it was "as enjoyable as it is unlikely".

The Android Invasion was reviewed favourably by John Kenneth Muir, who described it as "an atmosphere-laden suspense thriller", despite finding some deficiencies in the storyline, which he referred to as an idiot plot. Muir praised the conceit of frightening, android duplicates of familiar people, and he traced influences from the films Invasion of the Body Snatchers (1956) and The Stepford Wives (1975). He also notes the similarity of the depiction of androids in Doctor Who to the Fembots that appeared the following year in The Bionic Woman television series ("Kill Oscar", 1976), with "faces filled with circuitry and round, lifeless orbs for eyes". Another familiar science-fiction device used in The Android Invasion is that of artificial duplicate settings; Muir considered that the "fake" village of Devesham imitated scenarios seen in earlier television series such as Star Trek ("The Mark of Gideon", 1969), UFO ("Reflections in the Water", 1971) and Space: 1999 ("One Moment of Humanity").

== Commercial releases ==
=== In print ===
Doctor Who and the Android Invasion
- Author: Terrance Dicks
- Cover artist: Roy Knipe
- Series: Doctor Who book: Target novelisations
- Release number: (Assigned 2, but never used)
- Publisher: Target Books
- Publication date: 16 November 1978
- ISBN: 0-426-20037-3

A novelisation of this serial, written by Terrance Dicks, was published by Target Books in November 1978. The novelisation was later designated number 2 when Target opted to number the first seventy-three novelisations alphabetically; however no edition using the number was ever released.

=== Home media ===
The Android Invasion was released on VHS in February 1995. The serial was released on DVD in the US on 9 January 2012 as a stand-alone, and again on 9 January 2012 alongside Invasion of the Dinosaurs, coupled as the "UNIT Files" box set in the UK. This serial was released as part of the Doctor Who DVD Files in Issue 126 on 30 October 2013.
