= Terror of the Zygons =

080 – Terror of the Zygons
- Doctor Who serial

Cast
- Doctor: Tom Baker – Fourth Doctor
- Companions: Elisabeth Sladen – Sarah Jane Smith; Ian Marter – Harry Sullivan
- Others: Nicholas Courtney – Brigadier Lethbridge-Stewart; John Levene – Sergeant Benton; John Woodnutt – Duke of Forgill / Broton (uncredited); Lillias Walker – Sister Lamont; Robert Russell – The Caber; Keith Ashley, Ronald Gough – Zygons; Angus Lennie – Angus; Tony Sibbald – Huckle; Hugh Martin – Munro; Bruce Wightman – Radio Operator; Bernard G. High – Corporal; Peter Symonds – Soldier

Production
- Directed by: Douglas Camfield
- Written by: Robert Banks Stewart
- Script editor: Robert Holmes
- Produced by: Philip Hinchcliffe
- Music by: Geoffrey Burgon
- Production code: 4F
- Series: Season 13
- Running time: 4 episodes, 25 minutes each
- First broadcast: 30 August 1975
- Last broadcast: 20 September 1975

Chronology
← Preceded by Revenge of the Cybermen	Followed by → Planet of Evil

Terror of the Zygons is the first serial of the thirteenth season of the British science fiction television series Doctor Who, which was first broadcast in four weekly parts on BBC1 from 30 August to 20 September 1975. The serial was written by Robert Banks Stewart and directed by Douglas Camfield.

The serial stars Tom Baker as the Fourth Doctor alongside Elisabeth Sladen and Ian Marter as companions Sarah Jane Smith and Harry Sullivan, with the episode featuring Marter's and Nicholas Courtney's (as Brigadier Lethbridge-Stewart) final regular appearances. The serial is the first appearance of the Zygons, and is set in and around Loch Ness and in London. In the serial, the alien shapeshifters the Zygons plot to use their cyborg sea monster the Skarasen to take over the Earth, after they discover their home planet was destroyed.

The serial received a novelisation written by Terrance Dicks and several physical media releases. Terror of the Zygons was met with generally positive reviews. The episode's soundtrack, composed by Geoffrey Burgon, was released on 24 January 2000.

== Plot ==
The Fourth Doctor, Sarah Jane Smith and Harry Sullivan return back to Scotland in 1975, after Brigadier Lethbridge-Stewart calls them back for their help. Upon finding him at a village near Loch Ness, the Doctor learns from Lethbridge-Stewart that UNIT are investigating the destruction of oil rigs off the Scottish coastline. Survivors of the attack claim a huge sea creature was responsible; the Doctor confirms this by finding giant tooth marks in the wreckage of the latest attack that washed up on the shores.

During the investigation, Harry is abducted by a nurse while treating a survivor. When he comes too, he finds the nurse working with a few other humans, including the Duke of Forgil who opposed the oil drilling off the coast. To his shock, he discovers the humans are actually Zygons, a shapeshifting alien race, and the real humans being held prisoner. Broton, posing as the Duke, reveals the Zygons seek to xenoform Earth to suit their physiology; his group became stranded on the planet centuries ago, whereupon they learnt their home planet was destroyed during this time. To achieve their goal, Broton, waiting until Earth had developed suitable technology, had his group captured key humans, including the Duke, as they need their "body print" to mimick them; they then set about attacking oil rigs, in order to create an energy crisis, using an embryonic sea creature they brought to Earth called a Skarasen (which humans labelled as the Loch Ness Monster), which Broton controls remotely with the aid of cyborg technology implanted upon it.

Concerned about the Doctor, Broton sends a Zygon to find and eliminate him; however, Sarah encounters them, discovers they are fake, and raises the alarm. The Doctor attempts to pursue it, but is forced to defend himself against an attack from the Skarasen. Sarah soon becomes suspicious about the Duke, after a local bartender is murdered, and discovers the Zygon's ship through a secret passage in the Duke's castle. The Doctor later tracks her down, but is captured as Broton proceeds to the next phase of his plan, programming the Skarasen to head down to London. Whilst he is absent, the Doctor frees himself, Harry and Sarah, along with the Duke and the other humans. As the Zygons move their ship southwards, the Doctor traps them, forcing the ship to land and self-destruct; he and the others escape, as the Zygons within are killed.

Seeking to understand Broton's plan, the Duke reveals he is head of the Scotland Energy Commission, and that he was to attend an international energy conference in London with several high-level dignitaries. Upon learning the conference is being held next to the Thames, the Doctor realizes Broton intends to capture the dignitaries with the aid of the Skarasen. UNIT swiftly moves to secure the building, whereupon the Doctor, Harry and Sarah discover Broton in the basement. Cornered, Broton remotely orders the Skarasen to attack the conference, before Lethbridge-Stewart kills him. Recovering the control device, the Doctor tosses it into the Thames, which the Skarasen consumes; freed of its control, it returns to Loch Ness. In the aftermath of the attack, the Doctor returns to Scotland to recover his TARDIS. While Sarah agrees to journey with him, Harry decides to remain behind. The Doctor accepts this, as Harry, Lethbridge-Stewart and the Duke watch the TARDIS depart.

== Production ==
=== Development ===
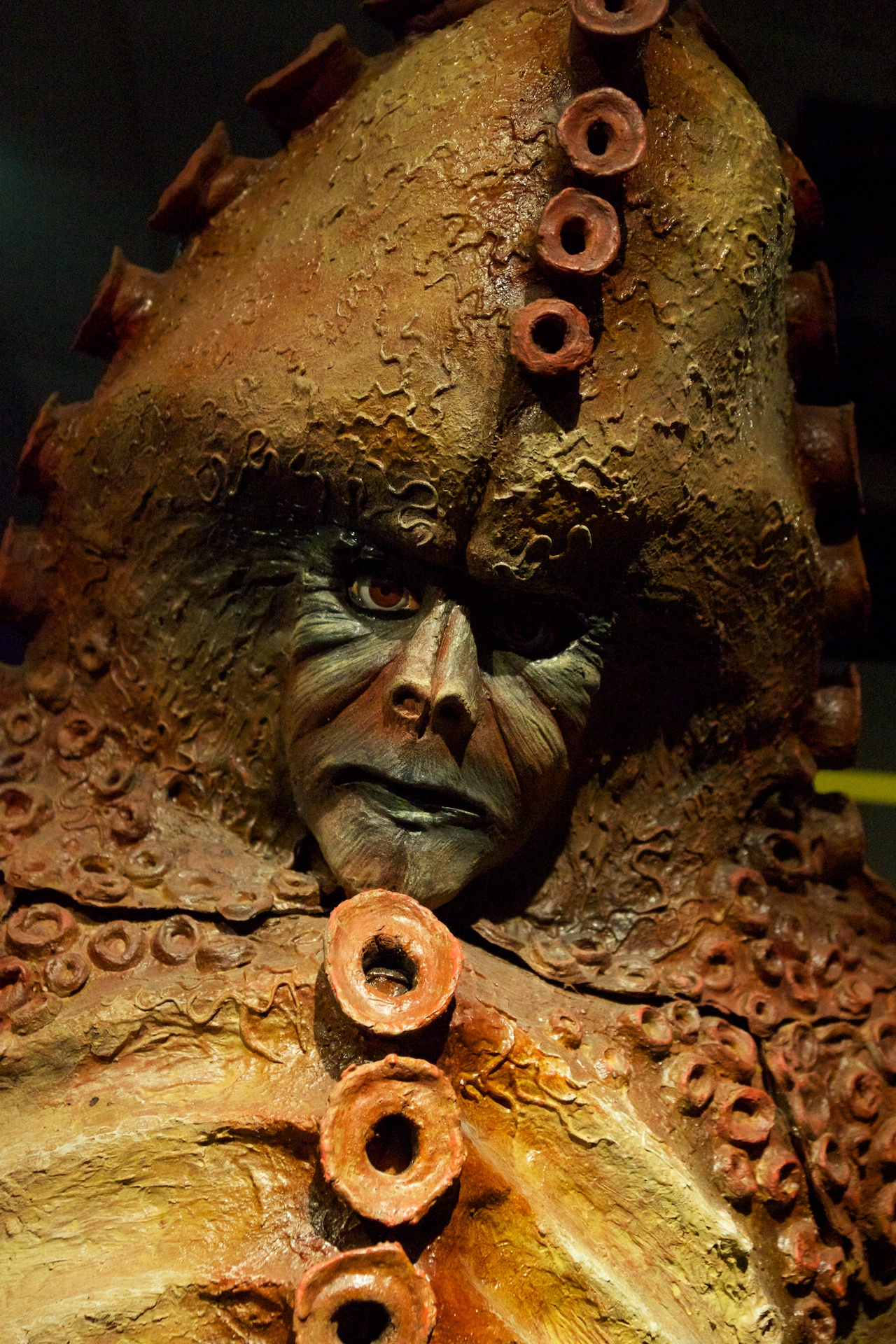
The Zygons, as they appear at the Doctor Who Experience

The serial was commissioned in April 1974 under the working title The Loch, changed later to The Secrets of the Loch, and finally Terror of the Zygons. The serial was the first serial that Robert Banks Stewart wrote for the programme. He set the serial in his native country Scotland, and adapted elements of the Loch Ness Monster myth. Stewart subsequently wrote the finale of the season, The Seeds of Doom (1976).

When Robert Holmes became head writer on the programme, he began to slowly phase out UNIT, a process which he intended to complete at the end of season 12 by ending the TARDIS crew's continuous adventures and delivering Harry Sullivan back to Earth. Terror of the Zygons was the intended season finale. However, Stewart could not complete the script in time so the serial was held back and became the first story of season 13, with a reduced order of four episodes instead of the original six. When Nicholas Courtney learned of Holmes' plan he suggested that his character should be killed off.

=== Filming ===
The serial was directed by Douglas Camfield. Camfield previously directed The Invasion (1968), which introduced UNIT; reportedly Camfield disliked the new costumes used for UNIT and preferred the ones used in The Invasion. Filming had to be rescheduled due to budget cuts. These cuts forced Courtney to exit a theatre role. Location filming took place in March 1975. According to Tom Baker, due to rain the filming of the episode was delayed by two days. Baker also stated that due to budgetary constraints, location filming in Scotland was not possible. Instead, location filming for Terror of the Zygons was shot in West Sussex, including at Climping beach, South Ambersham in the South Downs, and at the Hall Aggregates Quarry in Storrington. Studio recording took place the following month.

=== Casting ===
John Woodnutt had previously appeared alongside Jon Pertwee's Third Doctor as Hibbert in Spearhead from Space and the Draconian Emperor in Frontier in Space. He would go on to play Consul Seron in the penultimate Fourth Doctor serial, The Keeper of Traken. Angus Lennie previously played Storr in The Ice Warriors. This was Nicolas Courtney's last regular appearance in the series. The Brigadier would next be seen in Mawdryn Undead, almost eight years later. The Zygons would not return until the 50th anniversary special, "The Day of the Doctor".

== Release and reception ==
=== Ratings ===
Episode	Title	Run time	Original release date	UK viewers (millions)	Appreciation Index
1	"Part One"	21:41	30 August 1975	8.4	59
2	"Part Two"	25:08	6 September 1975	6.1	—
3	"Part Three"	24:09	13 September 1975	8.2	54
4	"Part Four"	25:22	20 September 1975	7.2	—

Terror of the Zygons was released on BBC1 in four weekly parts from 30 August to 20 September 1975. "Part One" was released to an audience of 8.4 million viewers making it the highest viewed episode. It was followed by the lowest viewed, "Part Two", with only 6.1 million. Parts three and four were viewed by 8.2 and 7.2 million viewers respectively. Audience Appreciation Index were taken for the first and third episodes, they scored ratings of 59 and 54.

=== Critical reception ===
In The Television Companion (1998), David J. Howe and Stephen James Walker wrote that Terror of the Zygons gave a stereotypical portrayal of the Scottish and showed how much the show had changed since abandoning its regular UNIT premise. They felt that the story gave UNIT its "dignity and believability" and praised the conception of the Zygons, though they noted that the shapeshifting concept was not original. Despite classifying the Skarasen as the "major weakness", they wrote that "the story remains a strong one". In 2010, Mark Braxton of the Radio Times praised the "exquisitely horrible" design of the Zygons and the cliffhanger of the first episode where a Zygon attacks Sarah. He also was positive towards guest actor John Woodnutt and the incidental music, calling the whole production "a class act", aside from the Loch Ness Monster. DVD Talk's John Sinnott gave the story four-and-a-half out of five stars, praising the cast and the design of the Zygons.

Ian Berriman of SFX felt that it was "churlish" to criticise the Loch Ness Monster effect when the story "gets so much right, including first-class direction, pitch-perfect performances and a hauntingly eerie, folky score". He also was positive towards the design of the Zygons and their spaceship, though he found their scheme farfetched. Christopher Bahn, reviewing the story for The A.V. Club, described it as "fun" but noted that it could be formulaic instead of trying to be "ground-breaking"; he criticised the scene in the second episode in which Broton tells Harry everything about the Zygons, which did not leave much surprise for the later episodes. Nevertheless, he praised the cast, the action sequences, and the Zygons, which he described as a "wonderfully surreal triumph of Doctor Who visual design", though otherwise they functioned as a typical monster-of-the-week.

Reviewing the serial in 1999, literary critic John Kenneth Muir acclaimed Terror of the Zygons as "a riveting and horrifying adventure", singling out the fleshy Zygon costumes for particular praise. He drew parallels with a number of historic Doctor Who serials, noting that the Zygon story drew on some familiar Doctor Who ingredients, including alien invasion (The Invasion), "body snatchers" (The Faceless Ones), an oil rig setting (Fury from the Deep), biomechanical technology (The Claws of Axos) and the revelation of an ancient Earth legend to be alien in origin (The Dæmons). However, he was disparaging of the use of a glove puppet to represent the Loch Ness Monster, comparing it to "the Invasion of the Dinosaurs debacle".

In 2009, a poll conducted by Doctor Who Magazine of the 200 stories produced up to that point saw the serial finish in seventeenth place.

== Commercial releases ==
=== In print ===
Doctor Who and the Loch Ness Monster
- Author: Terrance Dicks
- Cover artist: Chris Achilleos
- Series: Doctor Who book: Target novelisations
- Release number: 40
- Publisher: Target Books
- Publication date: 15 January 1976
- ISBN: 0-426-11041-2

A novelisation of this serial, written by Terrance Dicks, was published by Target Books in January 1976 under the title Doctor Who and the Loch Ness Monster.

=== Home media ===
Terror of the Zygons was first released in Australia on VHS in April 1987. It was later released in the United Kingdom on VHS in November 1988. It was first released in complete and unedited episodic format on LaserDisc in 1997. A new VHS release, also in episodic format, was released in August 1999 in the United Kingdom, and released in 2000 in the United States and Canada.

The serial was released on DVD on 30 September 2013. It features a director's cut version of Part One, with a previously unseen and newly restored 1 min 40-second opening scene featuring the Doctor, Sarah and Harry arriving in the TARDIS, which has materialised invisibly due to a faulty fusion plate. The restored scene was recoloured by Stuart Humphryes. The DVD release also included several promotional items including interviews, advertisements for the serial, and Baker's appearance on Disney Time.

A single-disc version (with no extras) of the DVD formed part of the Fourth Doctor Time Capsule, released on 29 July 2013. The serial was released on the BBC iPlayer on 1 November 2023 alongside most of the series' original run, but was removed a year later alongside The Seeds of Doom.

=== Soundtrack ===
Doctor Who: Terror of the Zygons

Soundtrack album by Geoffrey Burgon
- Released: 24 January 2000
- Genre: Soundtrack
- Length: 78:25
- Label: BBC Music
- Producer: Mark Ayres

Doctor Who soundtrack chronology
Original Soundtrack Recording (1997)	Terror of the Zygons (2000)	Doctor Who at the BBC Radiophonic Workshop Volume 1: The Early Years 1963–1969 (2000)

Geoffrey Burgon's music for his Doctor Who serials Terror of the Zygons and The Seeds of Doom were released on CD by BBC Music on 24 January 2000. The CD was sourced from the composer's own copies of the score, recorded at a low speed, resulting in lower fidelity.

==== Track listing ====
All music is composed by Geoffrey Burgon, unless otherwise noted.

No.	Title	Story	Length
1.	"Doctor Who Opening Title Theme" (Ron Grainer, realised by Delia Derbyshire)	various	0:32
2.	"The Destruction of Charlie Rig"	Terror of the Zygons	0:41
3.	"A Landing in Scotland"	Terror of the Zygons	1:22
4.	"Murder and Mystery on Tulloch Moor"	Terror of the Zygons	3:28
5.	"Wreckage"	Terror of the Zygons	1:18
6.	"The Zygons Attack"	Terror of the Zygons	0:51
7.	"Decompression"	Terror of the Zygons	1:09
8.	"The Zygons' Ultimate Weapon"	Terror of the Zygons	1:24
9.	"Trance"	Terror of the Zygons	0:50
10.	"False Harry"	Terror of the Zygons	3:59
11.	"Monster on the Moor"	Terror of the Zygons	3:27
12.	"Death at the Inn"/"Hunt for a Zygon"	Terror of the Zygons	2:18
13.	"The Secret of Forgill Castle"	Terror of the Zygons	1:44
14.	"Ascent and Descent"	Terror of the Zygons	1:28
15.	"A Call from the Prime Minister"	Terror of the Zygons	0:26
16.	"To London"/"Death of Broton"	Terror of the Zygons	2:55
17.	"The Monster Goes Home"	Terror of the Zygons	1:10
18.	"Return Ticket"	Terror of the Zygons	0:23
19.	"Antarctica: The First pod"	The Seeds of Doom	2:20
20.	"It's Growing!"	The Seeds of Doom	1:02
21.	"Harrison Chase"	The Seeds of Doom	0:42
22.	"The Pod Opens"	The Seeds of Doom	1:12
23.	"The Galactic Weed"	The Seeds of Doom	2:00
24.	"The Creature Attacks"	The Seeds of Doom	0:39
25.	"A Plan for Murder"/"Hunt in the Snow"	The Seeds of Doom	2:47
26.	"Sabotage"	The Seeds of Doom	1:40
27.	"Chase Receives the Second Pod"	The Seeds of Doom	1:08
28.	"The Chauffeur Takes a Detour"	The Seeds of Doom	1:28
29.	"A Visit to Harrison Chase"	The Seeds of Doom	2:11
30.	"The Hymn of the Plants"/"Floriana Requiem"	The Seeds of Doom	1:22
31.	"Escape and Recapture"	The Seeds of Doom	2:37
32.	"The Second Pod Bursts"	The Seeds of Doom	0:51
33.	"Keeler's Transformation Begins"	The Seeds of Doom	0:56
34.	"The Composter"	The Seeds of Doom	1:05
35.	"The Nurturing of Keeler"	The Seeds of Doom	4:33
36.	"Get Dunbar!"/"Krynoid on the Loose"	The Seeds of Doom	2:54
37.	"Amelia Ducat's Theme"	The Seeds of Doom	0:45
38.	"Molotov Cocktail"	The Seeds of Doom	1:26
39.	"The Plants Must Win"	The Seeds of Doom	2:28
40.	"The Plants Attack"	The Seeds of Doom	2:54
41.	"Laser Fire"	The Seeds of Doom	1:26
42.	"Trapped"	The Seeds of Doom	2:13
43.	"The Final Assault"	The Seeds of Doom	3:51
44.	"Doctor Who Closing Title Theme" (Ron Grainer realised by Delia Derbyshire)	various	0:55
Total length:			76:50

== Bibliography ==
- Cornell, Paul; Day, Martin; Topping, Keith (1995). "Terror of the Zygons". The Discontinuity Guide. London: Virgin Books. pp. 179–180. ISBN 0-426-20442-5.
- Haining, Peter. Doctor Who: 25 Glorious Years W H Allen (1988) ISBN 1-85227-021-7
- Lofficier, Jean-Marc (1994). The Doctor Who Programme Guide (Third ed.). Target Books. ISBN 0-426-20342-9.
- Barns, Alan (21 July 2004). "Terror of the Zygons". Doctor Who Magazine. No. 345.
- Ainsworth, John (2015). "Doctor Who - The Complete History: Genesis of the Daleks, Revenge of the Cybermen and Terror of the Zygons". Doctor Who - The Complete History. Vol. 23. Panini Comics.
