= Harry Sullivan (Doctor Who) =

Fictional character in the TV series Doctor Who

Dr. Harry Sullivan
- Doctor Who character
- First appearance: Robot (1974–1975)
- Last appearance: The Android Invasion (1975)
- Portrayed by: Ian Marter
- Duration: 1974–1975

In-universe information
- Species: Human
- Occupation: Navy Surgeon Lieutenant
- Affiliation: Fourth Doctor; UNIT; Royal Navy
- Home: Earth
- Home era: 20th century

Harry Sullivan is a fictional character from the British science-fiction television series Doctor Who and is a companion of the Fourth Doctor. Played by Ian Marter, the character appears as a regular during the programme's twelfth season in 1974–1975. Harry appeared in 7 stories (27 episodes).

== Character history ==
Doctor Harry Sullivan is a commissioned Surgeon-Lieutenant in the Royal Navy, who is attached as medical officer to the United Nations Intelligence Taskforce, the military organisation to which the Doctor acts as scientific advisor. He is first mentioned (though not seen) in Planet of the Spiders, when the Brigadier thinks the Third Doctor has gone into a coma. The Brigadier calls for Doctor Sullivan and asks him to come to the Doctor's laboratory, but tells him not to bother when Sergeant Benton wakes the Doctor by offering him a cup of coffee. In the next serial, Robot, after the Doctor's third regeneration, Sullivan is called in to attend him, and ends up travelling aboard the TARDIS with the Fourth Doctor and Sarah Jane Smith (played by Elisabeth Sladen) for several subsequent adventures.

Harry is rather old-fashioned and stereotypically English in his attitudes. Somewhat accident-prone, he once claimed he was always trapping his nose in the doors of Portsmouth barracks. He often employs slightly archaic language — for example, referring to Sarah Jane affectionately as "old thing" or "old girl". He is nonetheless depicted as possessing great bravery and a "can-do" attitude, adapting well to the many strange situations in which he finds himself. He can, however, also be quite clumsy and unsubtle, once leading the Doctor to declare, in a moment of frustration and at the top of his lungs, that "Harry Sullivan is an imbecile!" Nonetheless he is well liked by the Doctor and Sarah Jane, and has a slightly flirtatious relationship with her.

The character was originally devised by the production team as a means of handling any action scenes required in episodes when they had envisioned that the new Doctor would be played by an older actor, as had previously been the case (Sarah Jane even jokingly compares Harry to James Bond at one point). When forty-year-old Tom Baker was cast, however, this was no longer a concern and the decision was taken to write Harry out — something producer Philip Hinchcliffe later admitted was probably a mistake, as Harry was a likeable and popular character who worked well with both of his fellow leads.

Harry's last regular appearance is in the season thirteen opener Terror of the Zygons, which had actually been made at the conclusion of the twelfth production block and held over to start the following season. At the conclusion of this story he chooses to return to London by train rather than by TARDIS with the Doctor and Sarah Jane, who continue their adventures without him. He does, however, reappear three stories later in The Android Invasion, both as the original Harry and an android double. This is the character's final appearance in the programme.

A later production team gave some consideration to bringing Harry Sullivan back for a guest appearance in the 1983 story Mawdryn Undead, part of the programme's twentieth anniversary season. Their first choice was the character of Ian Chesterton, but those plans fell through due to actor William Russell being unavailable. In the end, they decided to use the character of Brigadier Lethbridge-Stewart (played by Nicholas Courtney) instead. Harry is mentioned in the story, however — the Brigadier tells the Fifth Doctor that he was "seconded to NATO" and was last heard of "doing something 'hush-hush' at Porton Down".

His photograph appears in the pilot episode of The Sarah Jane Adventures, hanging on the side of a roof joist in Sarah Jane Smith's attic, near a portrait of Brigadier Lethbridge-Stewart and a photograph of Sarah Jane and K-9 Mark III. These were the first uses of classic era imagery in the revived era of the Whoniverse. Also in this episode when Sarah Jane is thinking of names for her son she contemplates choosing the name Harry. In The Sarah Jane Adventures story "Death of the Doctor", Sarah Jane reveals that Harry continued as a doctor and saved thousands of lives with his vaccines.

In "The Zygon Inversion" Kate Stewart mentions that Sullivan developed a gas known as Z-67, which turns Zygons inside out. The Doctor confiscated the gas and formula to prevent its misuse, referring to the weapon as "the imbecile's gas", referencing his assertion in Revenge of the Cybermen that "Harry Sullivan is an imbecile!".

Harry is never actually seen in the Tardis console room in the series.

== Appearances in other media ==
After leaving the cast of the programme, Ian Marter went on to pen several novelisations of Doctor Who stories for Target Books, writing an original novel, Harry Sullivan's War, for them in 1985. In Harry Sullivan's War, the character has become an MI5 operative (supporting the Brigadier's comment in Mawdryn Undead). Marter was believed to have been planning a sequel at the time of his death from a diabetic coma the following year.

There was a biography of Sarah Jane Smith which stated that she and Harry developed a romantic relationship after her return from travelling with the Doctor. They later parted amicably and were still very fond of each other.

Between 1994 and 2003, the character of Harry appeared in several novels from Virgin Publishing and BBC Books. Some of these stories are set in gaps between televised adventures featuring the character, but in several books he has been seen either earlier or later in life.

In the Virgin Missing Adventures novel System Shock (1995) and the Past Doctor Adventures novel Millennium Shock (1999), both by Justin Richards, he is seen during the 1990s as a Deputy Director of MI5. An even later early-21st century Harry has a cameo in the New Adventure Damaged Goods by Russell T Davies.

The New Adventure Blood Heat (1993) by Jim Mortimore briefly depicts a parallel universe version of Harry serving on a nuclear submarine in a dystopian world ruled by the Silurians, where he manages to save the life of the Seventh Doctor's companion Bernice Summerfield.

In David A. McIntee's Past Doctor Adventure The Face of the Enemy (1998) Harry is seen still working for the Royal Navy before his secondment to UNIT, which he first encounters in the novel. He also appears in the novel Wolfsbane by Jacqueline Rayner, where he briefly aids the currently-amnesic Eighth Doctor in dealing with a plot involving a woman who believes herself to be the reincarnation of Morgan Le Fay in 1936 when the Fourth Doctor's TARDIS accidentally materialises there long enough for Harry to leave, having apparently been drawn off course by its damaged future self. Although the Eighth Doctor's amnesia and subsequent regenerations prevent either the Doctor or Harry from recognizing each other, Harry notes that the Doctor has a certain 'Doctorishness' about him.

In the Big Finish Productions audio drama UNIT: The Wasting (2005), Commodore Sullivan (who is working with NATO) is called on by the Brigadier for a favour but does not have a speaking part.

Harry's previously unknown younger stepbrother, Will Sullivan (also a medical doctor), appears in the second series of the Sarah Jane Smith Adventures (2005–2006) audio plays by Big Finish, voiced by Tom Chadbon. Harry is mentioned by both Will and Sarah Jane, but he is apparently on some secret assignment and neither has seen him for a long time. Will is eventually revealed to be a sleeper agent of a religious cult targeting Sarah Jane, and dies during the course of the series.

Harry appears in the Titan Doctor Who Ninth Doctor comic storyline Official Secrets, set in the 1970s, where he briefly takes command of UNIT during the Brigadier's absence while investigating the mysterious appearance of large monsters, meeting the Ninth Doctor, Rose Tyler and Captain Jack Harkness during the crisis.

=== Audio ===
In 2017, Big Finish released their first story to include the character of Harry Sullivan. It was narrated by The Monk (Rufus Hound) titled How to Win Planets and Influence People. In December 2018 the free subscriber short story Tuesday by Tony Jones also featured Harry Sullivan and was narrated by Stephen Critchlow.

In 2019, Big Finish released their third story featuring the character of Harry Sullivan narrated by Leela (Louise Jameson) titled #HarrySullivan.

The Big Finish audio drama, UNIT: Nemesis, released in November 2021, features Harry Sullivan having been pulled out of time into the 21st century to assist the modern-day UNIT. Sullivan is portrayed by Christopher Naylor in this series.

== Other mentions ==
A vision of Harry is seen along with every other companion (aside from Leela) on the scanner screen in Resurrection of the Daleks. Harry is also seen calling out to the Doctor just before his regeneration in Logopolis. He is also mentioned in The Sarah Jane Adventures story Death of the Doctor, with Sarah recounting his successful medical career, revealing "He did such good work with vaccines. He saved thousands of lives". In Doctor Who Magazine issue 512, discussing his 2017 episode "Knock Knock', writer Mike Bartlett revealed that the character of Harry in his episode was intended to be the grandson of Harry Sullivan (who, according to this episode, had gone "grey-packing" with his boyfriend to the Great Wall of China where he was arrested for trying to steal a piece). Harry Sullivan is again with Sarah Jane and the Fourth Doctor in "Scratchman", a novel written and later narrated by Tom Baker.

== List of appearances ==
=== Television ===
Season 12

- Robot
- The Ark in Space
- The Sontaran Experiment
- Genesis of the Daleks
- Revenge of the Cybermen

Season 13

- Terror of the Zygons
- The Android Invasion (episodes 2-4)

=== Audio ===
- How to Win Planets and Influence People by James Goss
- Tuesday by Tony Jones
- #HarrySullivan by Eddie Robson

=== Novels ===
The Companions of Doctor Who

- Harry Sullivan's War by Ian Marter

Virgin New Adventures

- Blood Heat by Jim Mortimore (parallel universe version of Harry)
- Damaged Goods by Russell T Davies

Virgin Missing Adventures

- System Shock by Justin Richards
- A Device of Death by Christopher Bulis

Past Doctor Adventures

- The Face of the Enemy by David A. McIntee
- Millennium Shock by Justin Richards
- Wolfsbane by Jacqueline Rayner

=== Short stories ===
- "The Man From DOCTO(R)" by Andrew Collins (Short Trips: Companions)
- "To Kill a Nandi Bear" by Paul Williams (Short Trips: Past Tense)
- "UNIT Christmas Parties: Ships That Pass" by Karen Dunn (Short Trips: A Christmas Treasury)
- "Suitors, Inc." by Paul Magrs (Short Trips: Seven Deadly Sins)
- "The Last Broadcast" by Matthew Griffiths (Short Trips: A Day in the Life)
- "Mutiny" by Robert Dick (Short Trips: Defining Patterns)
- "The Last Thing You Ever See" by Richard Goff (Short Trips: How the Doctor Changed My Life)
- "Balloon Debate" by Simon A. Forward (Short Trips: Companions)

=== Comics ===
- "The Psychic Jungle" by Paul Crompton (Doctor Who Annual 1976)
- "Neuronic Nightmare" by Paul Crompton (Doctor Who Annual 1976)
- "The Body Snatcher" by Paul Crompton (Doctor Who Annual 1977)
- "Menace on Metalupiter" by Paul Crompton (Doctor Who Annual 1977)
- "Black Destiny" by Gary Russell, Martin Geraghty and Bambos Georgiou (Doctor Who Magazine 235–237)
