= Robert Banks Stewart =

British screenwriter and producer (1931–2016)

- Stewart in 1981
- Born: 16 July 1931; Edinburgh, Scotland
- Died: 14 January 2016 (aged 84)
- Other name: Robert Stewart
- Occupations: Television writer, producer
- Known for: BBC and ITV drama
- Children: 4

Robert Banks Stewart (born Robert Stewart; 16 July 1931 – 14 January 2016) was a Scottish screenwriter, television producer and former journalist. Stewart contributed extensively to drama for the BBC and ITV, among other networks, for several decades. He is best known for creating and producing the series Shoestring (1979) and Bergerac (1981), which were both highly popular, with Stewart being nominated for a BAFTA for the former.

Stewart also contributed to the science-fiction television series Doctor Who, writing two stories which have retrospectively been considered among its best, and created the Zygons, which went on to be recurring antagonists in the programme. He also produced the television series Lovejoy (1986) and The Darling Buds of May (1991), with the latter garnering one of the highest ratings for a new series of British TV.

Stewart was born and raised in Edinburgh. Early in his life, he would begin writing, for which he would win a Burns essay prize. Leaving schooling at age 15, Stewart would contribute to a variety of news agencies prior to joining the television industry. Stewart died in 2016 due to cancer, aged 84.

== Early life ==
Robert Stewart was born in Portobello, Edinburgh on 16 July 1931. His father was a printer and performed as a pierrot clown in end-of-the-pier shows, and also served as a grocer while Stewart was growing up during the second World War. His mother worked as a tearoom waitress. Stewart went to primary school at Moray House in Edinburgh. Stewart's first experience with show business came from his father, with Stewart being inspired by his pierrot work. He began writing during primary school, with his first play being written at the age of nine. He contributed stories to the local newspaper. He would also win a Burns essay prize for his writing.

== Career ==
=== Early news career ===
Stewart left schooling at age 15, where he subsequently took up a job as an office boy at the Edinburgh Evening Dispatch. Following some time performing National Service, Stewart briefly joined as a sub-editor on The Scotsman before returning to the Evening Dispatch to act as its news editor. He later joined the Evening News and the Daily Record and also commentated on sports games for BBC Home Service. During this time, he produced stage plays and radio talks. He later worked as an international correspondent with Illustrated magazine.

=== Television career ===
Illustrated would soon fold due to increasing industry pressure. While most of his contemporaries would depart for work at the BBC, Stewart would join the Rank Organisation. He provided rewrites for several Pinewood Studios films, and would produce scripts for the Edgar Wallace Mysteries series, the 1959–1960 television series Interpol Calling, for which he served as its story editor, and the 1960–1962 spy series Danger Man. His work on Danger Man led to him nearly writing for the first ever James Bond film, though this fell through due to the death of the film's director.

Stewart subsequently contributed scripts to a variety of shows throughout the 60s and 70s. Early work included the series Dr. Finlay's Casebook, with a 1964 episode being the first televised usage of the "Banks Stewart" name; it was apparently suggested to him by new agent Beryl Vertue. He adopted the name "Banks" from his mother's maiden name and used it to distinguish himself from similarly named writers when he began to gain greater success in television.

Stewart would soon after gain an association with ITV, for whom he worked on the 1963–65 series The Human Jungle, as well as two episodes of the series The Avengers. He also created the 1965 television series Undermind, which focused on aliens invading the Earth. He would serve as the story editor for the show Armchair Theatre and the producer for the 1966 show Intrigue. He later worked with Australian Broadcasting Corporation for a variety of programs, though departed after working on the 1969 series Riptide due to concerns over the Australian union.

After returning back to the United Kingdom, he would assume story editor and writing credits on a variety of television series, including Jason King, Van der Valk, Arthur of the Britons, The Sweeney, and The Legend of Robin Hood. For his work on Arthur of the Britons, he would receive a Writers Guild Award, and his work on The Legend of Robin Hood would earn the BBC an Emmy nomination. In the mid-1970s, Stewart wrote for the science-fiction series Doctor Who, being brought on by script editor Robert Holmes as part of a drive to bring in new writers to the series. Stewart would write two stories for the series: Terror of the Zygons (1975) and The Seeds of Doom (1976), both of which would go on to be among the show's most highly regarded stories. One of his creations, the Zygons, became recurring antagonists in the series. During this time, Stewart, while attempting to discuss a script, was brought into production of the 1976 serial The Brain of Morbius, where he, alongside other behind the scenes figures for the series, were hastily photographed and used to represent past incarnations of the title character, the Doctor, resulting in a brief on-screen appearance. Though initially intending to write a third story for the series, he soon left to work with Thames TV, leaving the production team to write a replacement story.

While working with Thames, Stewart wrote and story edited for a number of shows, including Rooms and Armchair Thriller, with Stewart in particular helping the former to catch up after it had fallen behind schedule during production. He would also end up creating the 1980 children's series Jukes of Piccadilly. He returned to Scotland to work with STV, where he wrote for and created a variety of productions, and also worked on Charles Endell Esquire, which, due to an ITV strike, had difficulty airing throughout 1980. One of his productions, Between the Covers, would be nominated for a New York Film and Television drama award.

=== Shoestring and Bergerac ===
In 1978, Philip Hinchcliffe, who produced the series Target, departed his role, and recommended Stewart to take over. Target ended up being cancelled before Stewart could take up the offer. Stewart was subsequently asked to create a new crime drama to take Target's place. Stewart, alongside playwright Richard Harris, conceived of the idea of a show starring a private eye working for a radio station, hoping to match the success of American shows based around a single character such as Columbo. This concept evolved into Shoestring. The series quickly became a success with viewers, with The Guardian citing its setting in Bristol, distinctive soundtrack, and the performance of lead actor Trevor Eve for its popularity. The show garnered two series and was nominated for a BAFTA, becoming the first detective thriller show to be nominated in the TV drama series category. The show additionally kickstarted Eve's acting career. Shoestring was successful enough that NBC was interested in making an American adaptation. However, the proposed pilot was never produced. Stewart noted that a similar series to Shoestring, named Midnight Caller, was released a year after the failed pitch.

After Eve elected not to return for a third series, Stewart elected to create a new series. Taking the many successful elements of Shoestring, Stewart created Bergerac, which began airing in 1981. The series quickly became a hit with viewers, with its first series netting 17 million viewers and becoming the number one show in the country.

=== Later career ===
After two series of Bergerac, Stewart left his role as the show's producer. He became an executive producer of drama at London Weekend Television, though discovered earlier overspending had made making new productions unfeasible. He subsequently turned down an officer to become the head of drama at BBC Scotland, and returned to produce for the 1986 television series Lovejoy. He would also end up heading multiple series, including 1986's Call Me Mister and 1988's Hannay. He also produced episodes for the television adaptation of H. E. Bates's The Darling Buds of May, which proved to be a ratings hit, netting over 18 million viewers and gaining one of the highest ratings for a new series of British television. Stewart was said to have played a critical role in the casting of Catherine Zeta-Jones in the series, with her role in the series being instrumental in launching her career. He would later create the short-lived 1992 television series Moon and Son and also joined production company Portman, which was headed up by Hinchcliffe. He would reboot the drama McCallum in 1998. Another adaptation of Bates's works, My Uncle Silas, produced in the early 2000s, would end up being Stewart's final major production in television.

In 2013, he published a novel, The Hurricane's Tale, at the age of 81. It had previously been a turned-down television pitch. He later published his memoirs, titled To Put You in the Picture, in 2015.

== Personal life and death ==
Stewart would marry twice throughout his life, with both marriages ending in divorce. He met his first wife while acting in his first play and married her at a young age. The pair had a daughter together, and divorced when he was 24. He would later marry his second wife, Helen. They had three sons before getting divorced. During the late 1970s and early 1980s, Stewart lived with Rooms and Bergerac cast member Mela White.

Stewart believed ageism denied him many television opportunities later in life. Speaking to Digital Spy in 2013, he said many older writers had been having difficulty finding work, and believed the BBC had become too reliant on pre-existing series and formats instead of trying to make new programmes.

Stewart died of cancer on 14 January 2016 at the age of 84.

== Filmography ==
Television roles
Year	Title	Role	Ref
1959-1960	Interpol Calling	Story editor	
1960-1961	Danger Man	Writer	
1962	The Ordeal of Doctor Shannon	Writer and creator	
1960-1964	Edgar Wallace Mysteries	Writer	
1963-1965	The Human Jungle	Writer and co-creator	
1963-1964	The Saint	Writer	
1964-1965	Dr. Finlay's Casebook	Writer	
1965	Undermind	Creator	
1965-1966	The Avengers	Writer	
1966	Adam Adamant Lives!	Writer	
1966	Intrigue	Producer	
1966-1967	Armchair Theatre	Story editor	
1967-1969	Callan	Writer	
1968	Public Eye	Writer	
1969	Special Branch	Writer	
1969	Fraud Squad	Writer	
1969	Riptide	Associate producer, story editor	
1972	Jason King	Writer	
1972	Sharing the Honours	Writer and creator	
1973	Harriet's Back in Town	Story editor	
1973	Van der Valk	Story editor	
1973	Arthur of the Britons	Writer	
1973	New Scotland Yard	Writer	
1974	The Protectors	Writer	
1975	The Sweeney	Writer	
1975	The Legend of Robin Hood	Writer	
1975-1976	Sutherland's Law	Writer	
1975, 1976	Doctor Who	Writer: Terror of the Zygons; The Seeds of Doom; Portrayer (The Doctor): The Brain of Morbius	
1977	Rooms	Story editor	
1977	Owner Occupied	Writer and creator	
1978	Armchair Thriller	Story editor	
1980	Jukes of Piccadilly	Creator	
1979-1980	Charles Endell Esquire	Creator and writer	
1980	Home Front	Creator and writer	
1980	Between the Covers	Creator and writer	
1979-1980	Shoestring	Creator and producer	
1981-1983	Bergerac	Creator and producer	
1986	Lovejoy	Co-producer	
1986	Call Me Mister	Creator and producer	
1988	Hannay	Producer	
1991	The Darling Buds of May	Producer	
1992	Moon and Son	Creator, Producer, Writer	
1993	Frank Stubbs Promotes	Writer	
2001-2003	My Uncle Silas	Writer	
