= Douglas Camfield =

British television director (1931–1984)

- Born: Douglas Gaston Sydney Camfield; 8 May 1931; India
- Died: 27 January 1984 (aged 52); Hounslow, London, England
- Occupation: Television director
- Years active: 1961–1984
- Spouse: Sheila Dunn (m. 1965)
- Children: 1

Douglas Gaston Sydney Camfield (8 May 1931 – 27 January 1984) was a British television director, active from the 1960s to the 1980s. He is particularly known for his direction of many episodes of Doctor Who between 1964 and 1976.

== Early life and education ==
Douglas Gaston Sydney Camfield was born on 8 May 1931 in India.

He studied at the York School of Art and aimed to work for The Walt Disney Company. He was commissioned into the Royal Army Service Corps in 1951 during his national service. Later that year, he transferred to the West Yorkshire Regiment (Territorial Army). He was promoted to lieutenant in 1952 and was training to be in the Special Air Service, but due to an injury he pulled out of the application process. It has been noted by those who worked with him that Camfield always retained an affection for the army and brought military standards of organisation to the programmes he subsequently directed.

== Career ==
Camfield's directing credits include Doctor Who, Z-Cars, Paul Temple, Public Eye, The Lotus Eaters, Van der Valk, The Sweeney, The Onedin Line, Blake's 7, Shoestring, The Professionals, Out of the Unknown, The Nightmare Man, the BBC dramatisation of Beau Geste, and Ivanhoe, the 1982 television movie.

=== Doctor Who ===
Camfield is particularly well known for his work on Doctor Who and was production assistant on its earliest serials, both the pilot and broadcast versions of An Unearthly Child, and Marco Polo. He directed the first two episodes, as well as the location scenes for episodes 3–7 of Inferno; after Camfield suffered a heart attack during the production. The rest was directed by producer Barry Letts, who was uncredited. An important contribution to the series was Camfield's casting of Nicholas Courtney as Brigadier Lethbridge-Stewart, who became one of the longest-running and popular characters in its history.

In 1967, Camfield submitted an initial script, co-written with Robert Kitts, titled Operation Werewolf. It was not brought forward by then producer Innes Lloyd, but this was later adapted by Big Finish Productions in 2024. Shortly after directing The Seeds of Doom, Camfield was commissioned by Philip Hinchcliffe to write a four part serial in 1976. The Lost Legion, would have taken place at a North African outpost of the French Foreign Legion. The plot would have involved two alien races at war. It would have featured the death of the Doctor companion Sarah Jane Smith, as a way to write her out of the series. After repeated submission delays, the story was dropped from the schedule.

Camfield was also one of eight faces implied by represent pre-first Doctor incarnations of the Doctor in a climatic scene of The Brain of Morbius (1976). Notably, the incarnation represented by his image appeared again in a flashback sequence of the Virgin New Adventures novel Cold Fusion. The photo of Camfield used had originated as the ID card image for the Earth Adjudicator in a previous Doctor Who story Colony in Space.

== Personal life and death ==
Camfield was married to actress Sheila Dunn, whom he cast in the Doctor Who stories The Daleks' Master Plan, The Invasion and Inferno, all of which Camfield directed. They had a son, Joggs, who featured heavily in a DVD tribute documentary, Remembering Douglas Camfield, which was included in the 2013 DVD release of Camfield's Doctor Who serial Terror of the Zygons.

Camfield died of a heart attack on 27 January 1984 in Hounslow, London.

== Legacy ==
In 2013, as part of the fiftieth anniversary celebrations for Doctor Who, the BBC produced a drama depicting the creation and early days of the series. Camfield appears as a character in the drama An Adventure in Space and Time, portrayed by actor Sam Hoare.

== Doctor Who episodes ==
- Planet of Giants (episode 3 only) (1964)
- The Crusade (1965)
- The Time Meddler (1965)
- The Daleks' Master Plan (1965-6)
- The Web of Fear (1968)
- The Invasion (1968)
- Inferno (1970) (replaced by Barry Letts during production; see overview)
- Terror of the Zygons (1975)
- The Seeds of Doom (1976)
