= Ian Marter =

English actor and writer (1944–1986)

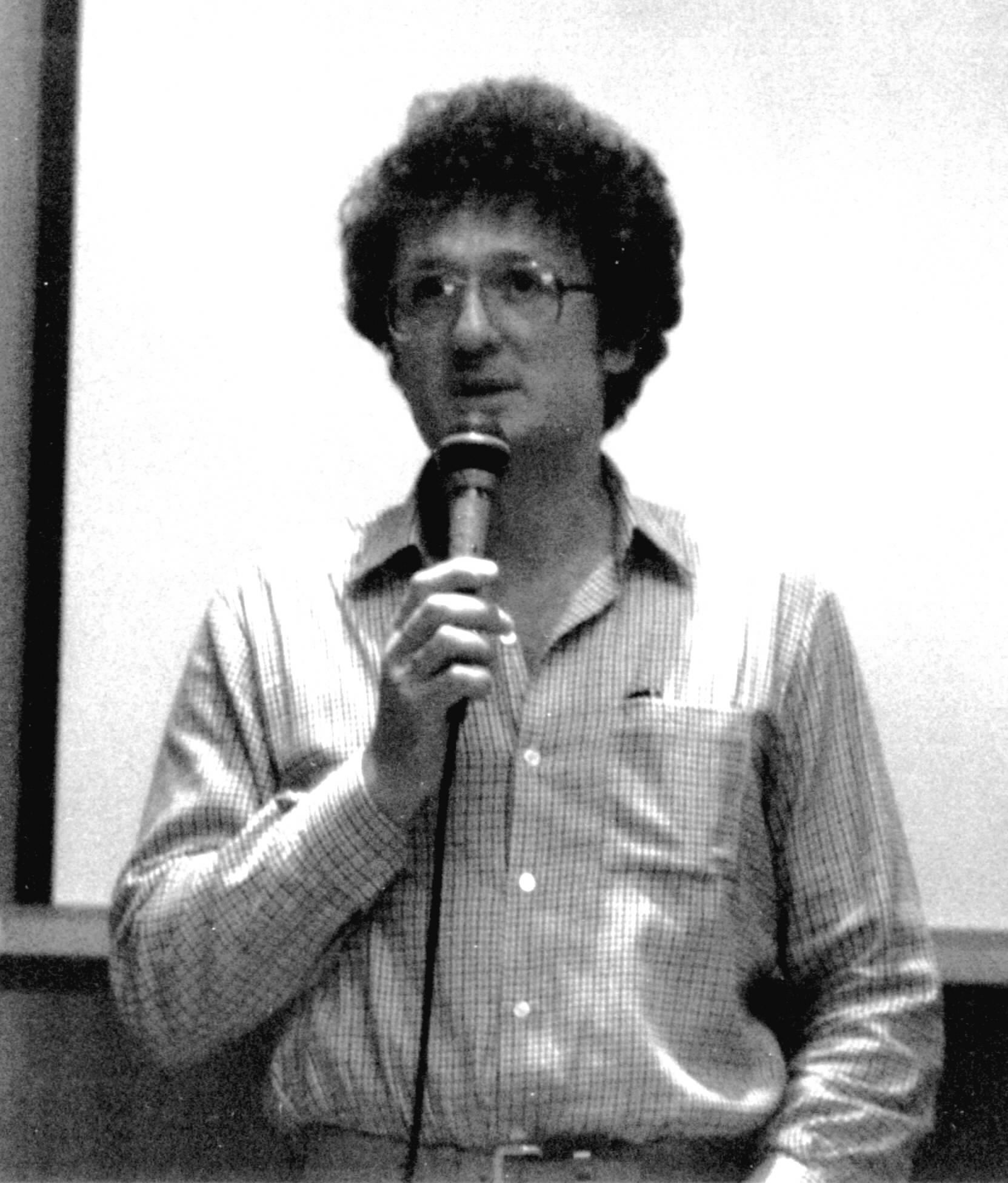
- Marter in 1983
- Born: Ian Don Marter; 28 October 1944; Keresley, Warwickshire, England
- Died: 28 October 1986 (aged 42); London, England
- Other name: Ian Don (pen name)
- Education: Bristol Old Vic Theatre School
- Alma mater: St Edmund Hall, Oxford
- Occupations: Actor and writer
- Years active: 1969–1986
- Children: 2

Ian Don Marter (28 October 1944 – 28 October 1986) was an English actor and writer. He is best known for playing Harry Sullivan in the BBC science-fiction television series Doctor Who (1974–1975), as well as for writing several novelisations of Doctor Who serials. He also novelised American films under the pseudonym Ian Don.

== Early life and education ==
Ian Don Marter was born in Keresley, Warwickshire on 28 October 1944, the son of Donald Marter, an RAF sergeant and electrician, and Helen Donaldson. Marter attended Beckenham and Penge Grammar School and was awarded a scholarship to St Edmund Hall, Oxford where he read English language and literature and was involved in the college's drama society. Marter graduated from St Edmund Hall in 1966 and started work at the Bristol Old Vic theatre, where he served as a stage manager in addition to acting in stage roles.

== Doctor Who ==
=== Actor ===
In 1971, Marter auditioned for the regular role of Captain Mike Yates in the eighth season of Doctor Who. He was offered the part, but was unable to accept due to a prior commitment. The production team were sufficiently impressed that they kept him in mind and cast him in a supporting role in the 1973 story Carnival of Monsters, broadcast as part of the tenth season of the programme.

The following year, Marter was cast in the role of Harry Sullivan, a character developed by the production team on the basis that the incoming Fourth Doctor could be portrayed by an older actor who would not be able to handle the more physical action scenes. After 40-year-old Tom Baker was cast, such concerns were allayed and Harry was written out after only one season.

Television appearances

- Carnival of Monsters (as John Andrews)
- Robot (as Harry Sullivan)
- The Ark in Space (as Harry Sullivan)
- The Sontaran Experiment (as Harry Sullivan)
- Genesis of the Daleks (as Harry Sullivan)
- Revenge of the Cybermen (as Harry Sullivan)
- Terror of the Zygons (as Harry Sullivan)
- The Android Invasion (episodes 2–4 as an Android impersonating Harry Sullivan, episode 4 as Harry Sullivan.)

=== Author ===
Marter remained involved with Doctor Who after his departure from the regular cast. He co-wrote the script for a Doctor Who feature film, titled Doctor Who Meets Scratchman (also known as Doctor Who and the Big Game), in collaboration with Baker and director James Hill. Due to a lack of funding, the project was ultimately abandoned. Marter's plot concerned Baker's Doctor coming face to face with Scratchman (an ancient term for the Devil). The finale was to have been acted out on a colossal pinball table, with the holes in the table being portals to other dimensions. Eventually, in 2019, a novelisation of this story by Baker and James Goss, simply titled Scratchman, was released by BBC Books, dedicated to Marter.

Marter later became involved with the writing of novelisations of Doctor Who TV serials for Target Books, penning nine such adaptations in the late 1970s and early 1980s. Marter's novelisations were somewhat controversial, most notably when the word "bastard" appeared in his novelisation of the 1967 story The Enemy of the World. The last of Marter's Doctor Who novelisations was The Rescue, which had to be completed by range editor Nigel Robinson due to Marter's unexpected death. Marter was one of a small group of Doctor Who actors to write licensed fiction based on the series.

Marter also wrote an original spin-off novel for Target, Harry Sullivan's War, featuring the return of his character, which was published in 1986 and was one of the earliest original Doctor Who-related novels to be released. Marter had been planning both a sequel to this novel and an adaptation of his unused Doctor Who Meets Scratchman script at the time of his death.

Books

- Doctor Who and the Ark in Space
- Doctor Who and the Sontaran Experiment
- Doctor Who and the Ribos Operation
- Doctor Who and the Enemy of the World
- Doctor Who - Earthshock
- Doctor Who - The Dominators
- Doctor Who - The Invasion
- Doctor Who - The Reign of Terror
- Doctor Who - The Rescue
- The Companions of Doctor Who - Harry Sullivan's War

== Later career ==
=== Actor ===
Marter's acting career beyond Doctor Who comprised mainly roles in episodes of series such as the BBC's The Brothers (1972), Crown Court, Bergerac (1981) and Granada Television's The Return of Sherlock Holmes (1986). He also had minor roles in several films, such as Doctor Faustus (1967), The Abominable Dr. Phibes (1971), North and South, The Medusa Touch (1978), and the comedy short The Waterloo Bridge Handicap (1978). Marter lived and worked in New Zealand in the early 1980s, appearing in the soap opera Close to Home from 1982.

=== Author ===
In addition to his Doctor Who novelisations, Marter wrote adaptations of several 1980s American films such as Splash and Down and Out in Beverly Hills for Target and its imprint, Star Books. With the exception of Down and Out in Beverly Hills, these books were published under the pen name Ian Don.

Other novelizations:

- Splash (Touchstone, Star Books, 1984)
- Baby (Disney, Star Books, 1985)
- My Science Project (Touchstone, Target Books, 1985)
- Down and Out in Beverly Hills (as Ian Marter, Touchstone, Star Books, 1986)
- Tough Guys (Touchstone, Star Books, 1986)

Gummi Bears Picture Books:

- Book 1 Disney's Gummi Bears: Zummi Makes It Hot (Disney, Target Books, 1986)
- Book 2 Disney's Gummi Bears: Gummi In A Gilded Cage (Disney, Target Books, 1986)
- Book 3 Disney's Gummi Bears: The Secret of the Juice (Disney, Target Books, 1986)
- Book 4 Disney's Gummi Bears: Light Makes Right (Disney, Target Books, 1986)

== Personal life ==
According to Doctor Who co-star Nicholas Courtney, Marter had come out to him as bisexual.

Marter had a wife and sons, but was divorced.

Marter died on 28 October 1986, his 42nd birthday, from a heart attack associated with diabetes-related cardiovascular disease.
