= The Invasion (Doctor Who) =

046 – The Invasion
- Doctor Who serial
- The Cybermen emerge in front of St Paul's Cathedral, considered to be one of the show's iconic scenes.

Cast
- Doctor: Patrick Troughton – Second Doctor
- Companions: Frazer Hines – Jamie McCrimmon; Wendy Padbury – Zoe Heriot
- Others: Edward Burnham – Professor Watkins; Sally Faulkner – Isobel Watkins; Nicholas Courtney – Brigadier Lethbridge-Stewart; Kevin Stoney – Tobias Vaughn; Peter Halliday – Packer (Note: Also provided Cyberman and Cyberdirector voices uncredited.); Geoffrey Cheshire – Tracy; Ian Fairbairn – Gregory; Edward Dentith – Major General Rutlidge; Clifford Earl – Major Branwell; Robert Sidaway – Captain Turner; Norman Hartley – Sergeant Peters; James Thornhill – Sergeant Walters; John Levene – Corporal Benton (Note: Uncredited in episode 5.); Stacy Davies – Private Perkins; Sheila Dunn – Phone Operator; Murray Evans – Lorry Driver; Walter Randall – Patrolman; Peter Thompson – Workman; Dominic Allan – Policeman; Pat Gorman, Ralph Carrigan, Charles Finch, John Spradbury, Derek Chafer, Terence Denville, Peter Thornton, Richard King – Cybermen

Production
- Directed by: Douglas Camfield
- Written by: Derrick Sherwin, from a story by Kit Pedler
- Script editor: Terrance Dicks
- Produced by: Peter Bryant
- Music by: Don Harper
- Production code: VV
- Series: Season 6
- Running time: 8 episodes, 25 minutes each
- Episode(s) missing: 2 episodes (1 and 4)
- First broadcast: 2 November 1968
- Last broadcast: 21 December 1968

Chronology
← Preceded by The Mind Robber	Followed by → The Krotons

The Invasion is the third serial of the sixth season of the British science fiction television series Doctor Who, which was first broadcast on BBC1 in eight weekly parts from 2 November to 21 December 1968. In the serial, Tobias Vaughn (Kevin Stoney), the head of a successful electronics company, forms an alliance with the Cybermen to conquer Earth. The Doctor (Patrick Troughton) and his companions, Jamie McCrimmon (Frazer Hines) and Zoe Heriot (Wendy Padbury), team up with UNIT, headed by Brigadier Lethbridge-Stewart (Nicholas Courtney), to combat the invasion.

The serial was conceived by Kit Pedler, after another Cyberman story was ordered by Peter Bryant during the production of The Wheel in Space (1968), a part of the fifth season. A full script was then written by Derrick Sherwin, which was intended to be a follow-up to The Web of Fear (1968), another fifth season serial. Due to the lower budget required for an action based story set on Earth, the serial was envisioned as a pilot to the Third Doctor's Earth based serials. Directed by Douglas Camfield, filming took place between 30 August and 8 November 1968 with two weeks being dedicated to extensive location shoots. The serial marks the first appearance of UNIT and the return of Lethbridge-Stewart from The Web of Fear, both of which would become recurring elements in the show.

The serial averaged 6.9 million viewers, which was a slight increase from the previous serial. The Invasion has received a generally positive reception, with reviewers praising the serial's atmosphere and direction, Stoney's performance, the Cybermen costumes, and Don Harper's score, although the serial's length has received mixed reactions. In 1971, the master tapes of all episodes were ordered to be junked, causing episodes 1 and 4 to be missing from the BBC's archives. While the other 6 episodes survive, some stills and full audio recordings of the missing episodes exist. The story has been novelised by Ian Marter and has been released on VHS, DVD, and as an audiobook. In 2006, it became the first incomplete Doctor Who serial to receive official full-length animated reconstructions of its two missing episodes based on the pre-existing material.

== Plot ==
The TARDIS appears above the dark side of the Moon, whereupon a rocket is fired upon it. The Doctor, Jamie and Zoe land the damaged TARDIS in the countryside and go to find Professor Edward Travers in London for his assistance. They discover Travers has leased his house to Professor Watkins and his niece Isobel. Watkins has gone missing while working for a shadowy electronics company called International Electromatics. The Doctor and Jamie leave to investigate its head office, where they meet Tobias Vaughn, the company's Managing Director, and reunite with a promoted Brigadier Lethbridge-Stewart, head of a military taskforce called UNIT, which investigates unusual activities around the world.

Taken to the company's countryside base, the Doctor and Jamie meet Watkins, who is working on a "Cerebration Mentor" device, which can instill specific emotions. Watkins reveals that Vaughn is working with an unspecified ally and that they are planning to take over the world. Further investigation reveals this ally as the Cybermen, who intend to send a hypnotic signal through the devices produced by International Electromatics, which will incapacitate the world's population and nullify resistance. The Doctor is able to protect his companions and their UNIT allies with specially made depolarisers that neutralise the Cybermen's signal, which were created by a newly freed Watkins. The Cybermen take over, as the group flees Vaughn's soldiers, who attempt to recapture Watkins.

After completing production on more depolarisers, the Doctor leaves to confront Vaughn in London whilst UNIT works to stop the Cybermen. Uncovering Russian plans for a lunar rocket launch, Turner leads a squadron to assist them in repurposing it to attack the ship sending the signals whilst Zoe helps the Brigadier predict the Cyberfleet's movements. Using British artillery, they are able to destroy the full fleet, causing the Cybermen to turn on Vaughn and decide to destroy Earth with a megatron bomb. His plans to preemptively betray the Cybermen by using the Cerebration Mentor against them ruined, Vaughn agrees to thwart the invasion and helps the Doctor locate the homing signal. With UNIT sending troops to help, they defeat the Cybermen guarding the beacon and turn it off, though an ambush kills Vaughn. The megatron bomb is destroyed by an anti-missile defence rocket, while the Russian rocket destroys the Cybership broadcasting the hypnotic control signal, ending the invasion. Following the success, the Doctor and his companions leave in the repaired TARDIS.

== Production ==
=== Conception and writing ===
During the production of The Wheel in Space (1968), Peter Bryant commissioned a fifth Cyberman serial from Kit Pedler following their positive reception in previous serials. The developed serial was intended to be a six-part story under the working title The Return of the Cybermen, a name shared with the working title of The Moonbase (1967). Over the summer, the serial would be retitled to keep the appearance of the Cybermen a surprise. The Radio Times, however, would reveal the twist prematurely. Bryant felt that the outline could only fill 4 episodes. Still, he paid Pedler on 14 May for the rights to the outline, the Cybermen and Cybermats. However, the latter would not appear in the final serial. Pedler also created Tobias Vaughn, whose name was inspired by a book of Christian names that Pedler owned. A full script was intended to be finished by David Whitaker, who also wrote The Wheel in Space, but he had commitments to other shows. Pedler's collaborator Gerry Davis was also approached, but was busy as the script editor for The First Lady. Derrick Sherwin, the show's leaving script editor, was hired by Bryant to finish the script and expand it to a total of 8 episodes by 1 June, while assistant story editor Terrance Dicks became the full-time script editor. Additional rewrites of the script occurred from 10 May to 26 August. Inspired by the Quatermass series (particularly Quatermass II), the goal of the scripts was to write a serial focused on action, which would be based on Earth; Sherwin and Bryant intended this to serve as a basis for the show's next season, which could then be produced on a lower budget. The BBC approved the first five episodes on 11 June, with the last three being approved on 27 August.

The serial was intended to mark the return of Professor Travers, Lethbridge-Stewart and Driver Evans, all of whom appeared in The Web of Fear (1968). Evans was excluded as the BBC believed him to be a harmful stereotype of the Welsh by implying that they were cowards. The Web of Fear writers Mervyn Haisman and Henry Lincoln agreed in May 1968 to the use of Travers and Lethbridge-Stewart, despite ongoing disputes between the BBC and both writers over rewrites to The Dominators (1968). Travers was replaced by Professor Watkins, due to Travers' actor, Jack Watling, costing too much for the role he would have in the story; Rewrites had reduced the character's prominence, which caused the BBC not to offer him the role. Anne Travers, Travers' niece, would be replaced by Isobel, who was envisioned as a possible companion for a season set on Earth. Only Lethbridge-Stewart was kept in the story, as replacing him with a similar character would allow Haisman and Lincoln to claim ownership over the derivative character, and the writers were paid £5 (equivalent to £76 in 2025) per episode for Lethbridge-Stewart's use. The character would be promoted to the rank of brigadier and placed as the head of UNIT, which was conceived by Sherwin to be part of the formula of the following season. UNIT would go on to be a recurring presence in the classic series (being a key element of the Third Doctor's era) and the new series. The director of The Web of Fear, Douglas Camfield, would be rehired to help bring a similar atmosphere to the project.

=== Music and design ===
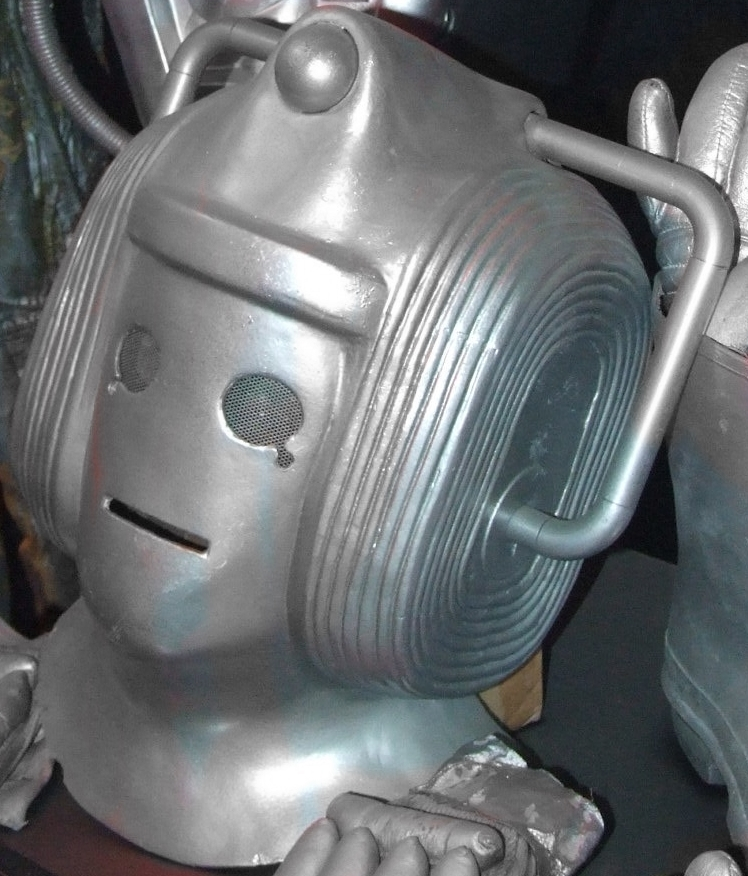
A Cyberman helmet from the serial, pictured at an exhibition.

Australian composer Don Harper was hired to compose the incidental music for the serial in his only work on Doctor Who. Camfield's refusal to use regular composer Dudley Simpson led to Harper being commissioned. Simpson believed Camfield did not employ him because of a dispute the two had at a dinner party about Simpson's earnings. However, Camfield claimed he did not want to have Simpson working too long on the same show. Harper had previously worked with Camfield on Out of the Unknown in May 1968. Harper then asked Simpson for advice for his gig, which Simpson gave without being aware of what show Harper was working on. Initially the music was planned to be recorded on 30 August, however the recording was rescheduled. Harper ultimately composed 20 minutes of cues, of which 13 minutes were used; the cues were recorded on 16 September with his ensemble. Though uncommon at the time, the music was pre-recorded for the music to last through several scenes, even when the scenes were shot out of order. The music was supplemented with tracks by John Baker for Out of the Unknown and Henry Hall, as well as stock music. Brian Hodgson composed several sound effects to be used in the serial, as well as some supplemental music in Harper's style.

Originally, the Cyberman were meant to reuse the costumes produced in 1967, but due to most of the old costumes (Note: Only 2 helmets of the 8 created costumes remained usable, which would be used in Wheel in Space.) being unusable and the serial requiring large groups of Cybermen, new costumes would be created. Costume designer Bobi Bartlett, in her first work for the programme, redesigned them to appear more militaristic and "tough", with 6 new costumes being assembled. The Cybermen's helmets were given an "earmuff" shape, had a built-in torch, and were made of fibreglass. The helmets were more comfortable, since they were a looser fit to increase air circulation and prevent fainting, which had been a problem during The Moonbase. The rest of the costume being based on a two-piece wetsuit, army boots and gloves, all painted grey, though the paint would crack during production. The chest devices were also redesigned to be smaller and contain battery powered lights. Heat caused the costumes to become sweaty to the point that pints of sweat would be poured from the boots over the course of filming, with one actor's boots audibly squelching during production. Additionally, the actors' movements loosened the metallic rods on the bodysuits, a problem also encountered with the costumes in The Wheel in Space, which caused an injury during filming. Camfield was advised for the design of the uniforms of UNIT soldiers, which like other costumes were designed to be slightly futuristic, (Note: Though no specific year is given within the serial itself, the Radio Times listing and continuity announcer placed the serial in 1975.) because of his former experience in the military. Camfield disliked the costumes and avoided them for his following serial.

The serial's sets were designed by Richard Hunt, who had previously worked on three Doctor Who serials: Galaxy 4, "Mission to the Unknown" (both 1965) and The Smugglers (1966). The Invasion was taken as an experiment by Hunt and Camfield to use the limited space in Lime Grove's Studio D more efficiently. Sets would be built in front of each other and taken apart during breaks in filming to use the sets behind. The Design Department was required to build 17 sets, with the first 3 episodes requiring 7 each, causing internal panic. Make-up was done by Sylvia Jones, who had worked on the job since The Abominable Snowmen (1967). The serial featured a large number of firearms, which required an armourer; since all of the armourers from the Props Department were busy or on vacation, a contractor was hired. The Cybermen's guns were designed to shoot smoke charges, which were only used in location shoots due to safety regulations.

=== Casting ===
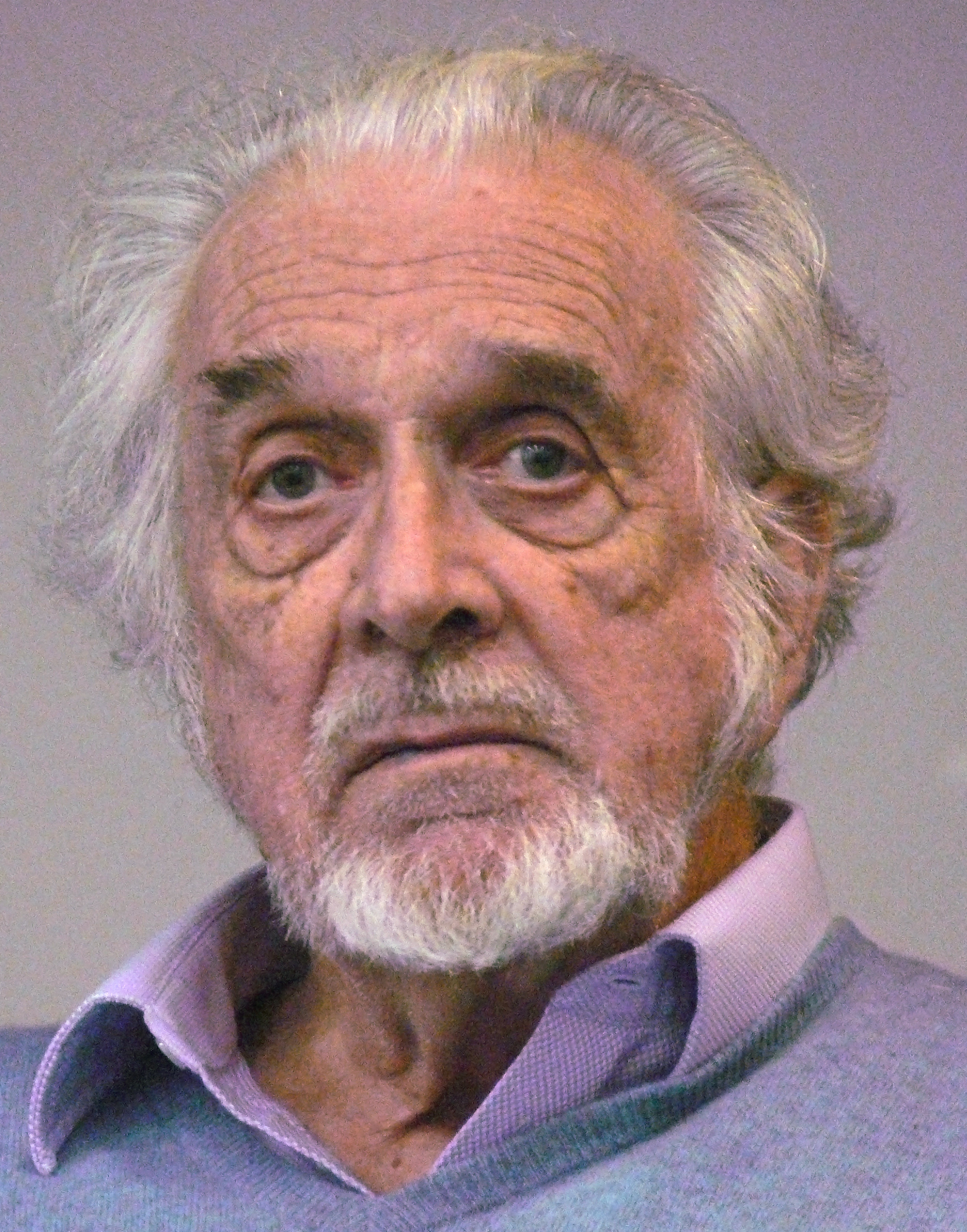
Nicholas Courtney (pictured in 2010) would be offered a recurring role as Brigadier Lethbridge-Stewart during the serial's production, which he accepted.

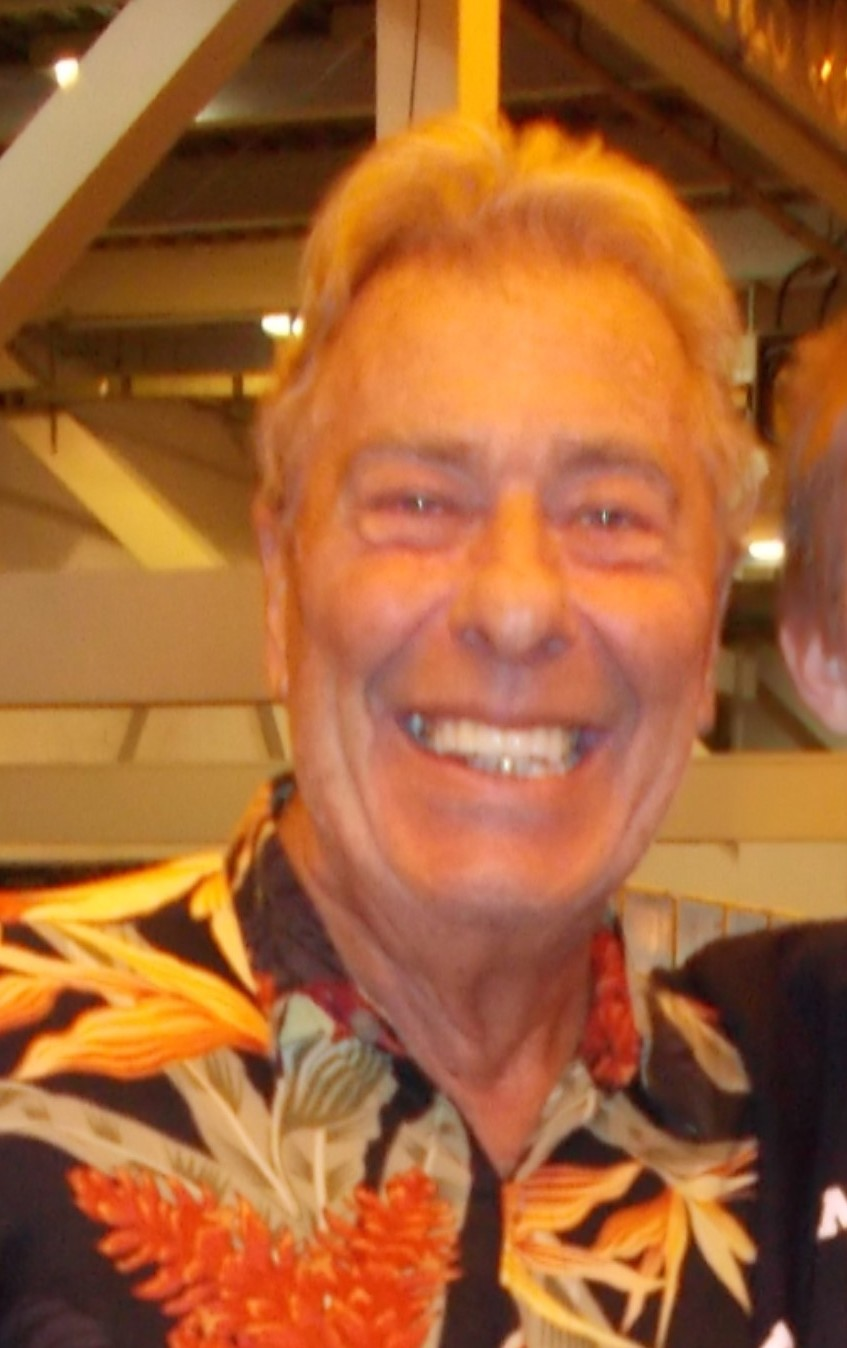
The Invasion was John Levene's (pictured in 2014) first appearance as Sergeant Benton, who would become a recurring character.

Many cast members on The Invasion had previously been featured on Doctor Who or were acquaintances of director Douglas Camfield. Kevin Stoney was chosen to play Vaughn, following his appearance as Mavic Chen in The Daleks' Master Plan (1965–66), where he worked with Camfield. Stoney would later return to the show to play Tyrum in Revenge of the Cybermen (1975). Nicholas Courtney returned as Lethbridge-Stewart and would be offered a reoccurring role on the show during production by Peter Bryant, which Courtney accepted. John Levene, who had previously played a Cyberman in The Moonbase (1967) and a Yeti in The Web of Fear (1968), was initially planned to play a Cyberman again. Levene was then either recast to play Corporal Benton after the original actor was fired for repeated tardiness, or hired directly. He also replaced actor James Thornhill, who played Sergeant Walters, in episode 8, as Thornhill had been fired. Levene would become a recurring actor on the show as Benton during the Third Doctor's run, starting in The Ambassadors of Death (1970) until his last regular appearance in the show in The Android Invasion (1975), and starred in the spin-off film Wartime (1988). Sally Faulkner was cast through an audition, which was unusual for the programme, as she was intended to possibly return in the role. Falkner would return to Doctor Who projects through audio plays, playing Miss Tremayne in the Winter for the Adept and General Brennan in Bernice Summerfield: The Secret of Cassandra (both 2000).

Peter Halliday, who plays Packer, had previously worked with Camfield on Out of the Unknown several months earlier. Halliday also supplied the voice of the Cyber Director in all eight episodes of the serial, in addition to the Cybermen voices in the last four episodes. In addition, Halliday went on to do several other roles (both voice and acting) in several later serials in the series. Edward Burnham was originally supposed to supply the voice of the Cyber Director in addition to his role as Professor Watkins. He would later portray Professor Kettlewell in the Fourth Doctor serial, Robot (1974–75). Clifford Earl previously played the station sergeant in The Daleks' Master Plan. Geoffrey Cheshire worked with Camfield in The Time Meddler (1965) and The Daleks' Master Plan. Norman Hartley also worked alongside Camfield on The Time Meddler, Out of the Unknown and Breaking Point. Robert Sidaway had previously been in The Savages (1966) as Avon, before playing Captain Turner. Walter Randall, who played a patrolman, had previously been in The Aztecs (1964), The Crusade (1965) and The Daleks' Master Plan, the latter two directed by Camfield. Ian Fairbairn had previously played Questa in The Macra Terror (1967) and would later play Bromley in Inferno (1970) and Doctor Chester in The Seeds of Doom (1976), both stories directed by Camfield. Dominic Allen had also worked with Camfield in Detective. Edward Dentith, who played Rutlidge, had worked on Watch the Birdies with Camfield. Camfield also hired his wife, Sheila Dunn, who previously played Blossom Lefavre in The Daleks' Master Plan, to cameo as a phone operator and a computer voice. Dunn would later play Petra Williams in Inferno, which was also directed by Camfield. Camfield also appeared in the serial's first episode himself, cameoing as a car driver.

=== Filming ===
Due to the then-improved videotape editing technology, many scenes from The Invasion were recorded out of order. Although the serial is the third in the season, it was the first produced in the recording block, with the other two being from the previous block. Filming began on 30 August at the Ealing Studios, where they filmed models for episodes 1, 7 and 8. Wendy Padbury does not appear in episode 3, as she was on holiday. Frazer Hines was on a scheduled break during the last episode but did appear in a pre-recorded film insert at the conclusion. Due to the large number of changes to the following serial, The Invasion does not feature a cliffhanger leading into the next story, which was unusual for the programme. The production received support from the Ministry of Defence, due to the serial's positive portrayal of the military. Scenes involving a helicopter were intended to be filmed at RAF Fairford on 3 September, however issues with insurance delayed filming. Therefore, scenes featuring a Hercules aircraft were filmed, with RAF personnel playing UNIT soldiers. For the battle against the Cybermen in the eighth episode, the Ministry provided military equipment and active members of the Coldstream Guards' second battalion, who served as extras. Due to the support, the Ministry of Defence received a special thanks in the credits of episode 8.

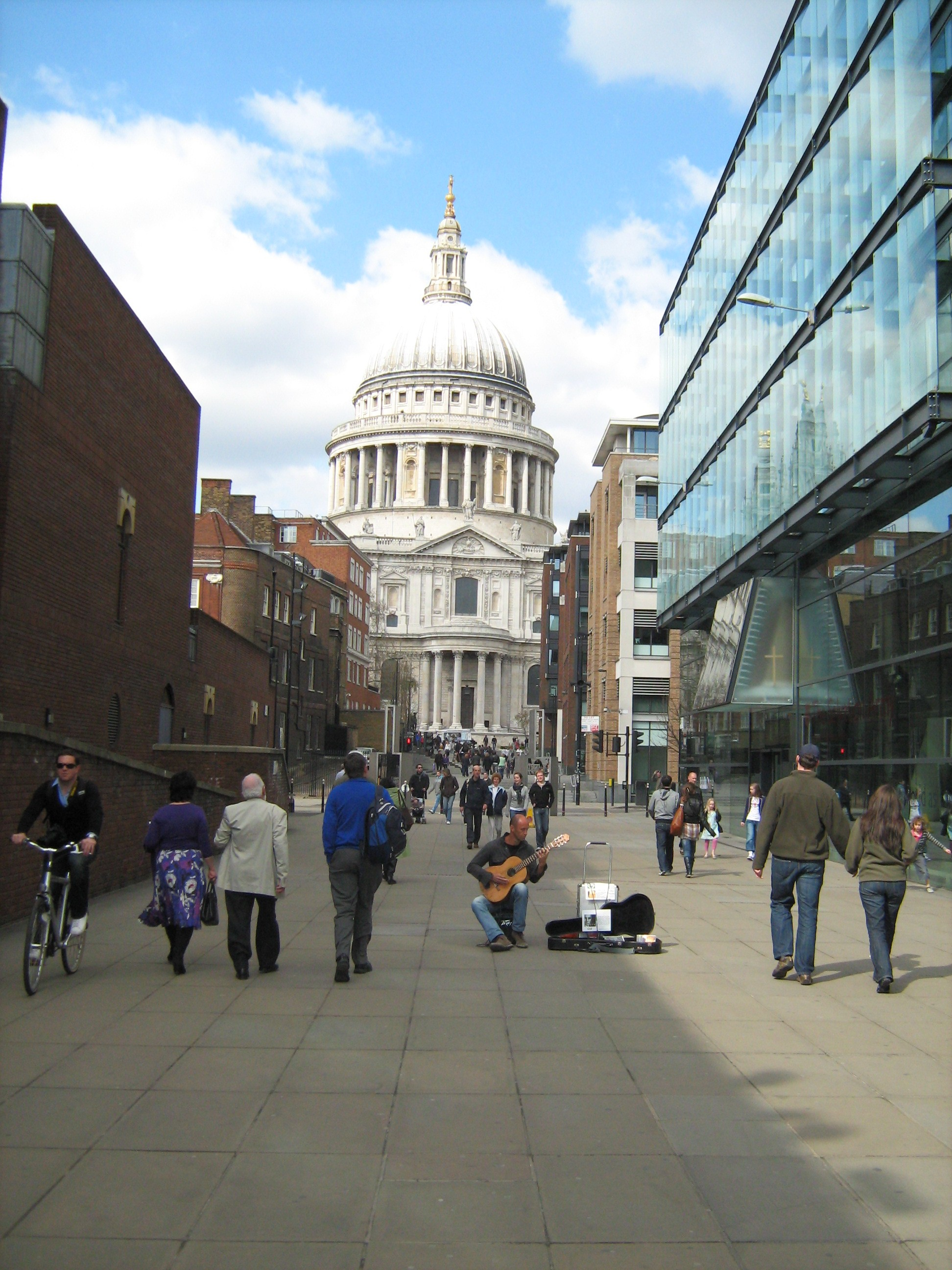
Parts of The Invasion were filmed at or near St Paul's Cathedral (pictured in 2010). St Paul's was chosen, due to it being a distinctive feature in the London skyline.

For the new production block, Patrick Troughton and Barry Letts had advocated an additional week of production for location and effects shots, which was granted by Shaun Sutton, the Head of Drama. The serial involved major location shooting over the span of two weeks due to its length, which was shot on 16 mm film. Location shooting began on 3 September in Gloucestershire, including scenes of the TARDIS landing and leaving. Scenes where the TARDIS is invisible were filmed using a split screen shot, with a pole marking the border. A Sud Aviation Alouette II was rented from Gregory Air Services for a helicopter scene, but filmed two days later than intended at Kingston Materials and a field in Gloucestershire. The shots were then edited together to make the helicopter appear to be flying over a building, as safety regulations prevented flying the helicopter directly over buildings. According to Hines, Sally Faulkner's skirt kept getting blown up around her neck whilst climbing up the rope ladder to the helicopter. To avoid the same thing happening to his kilt, Hines' dresser, a keen fisherman, sewed some lead weights into his kilt, after Hines had read that the Queen did something similar. The following day, additional helicopter escape scenes were filmed in Wallingford at an Associated British Maltsters factory.

On 7 September, filming had moved to London, including scenes at Millbank Tower. The St Paul's Cathedral shoot was done the next day, a Sunday, in the early morning to avoid commuters interrupting the shoot; however, crowds still gathered around and delayed the shoot, upsetting Camfield. It had also been planned to film the Cybermen at Tower Bridge, the Palace of Westminster, Hyde Park and Underground stations, though the shots were abandoned due to time constraints. The following two days were spent filming the battle between UNIT and the Cybermen at a factory in Ealing, though more teams returned two days later for additional footage. Miscellaneous scenes were shot on 11 September, including at a Guinness factory, where the crew were given a lunch of Christmas pudding and alcohol, which caused Troughton and Hines to continuously drunkenly fall over during filming. Additional puddings were given as gifts to the primary cast. Location filming ended on the 13th, with scenes being filmed close to the Ealing Studios.

Rehearsals started on 16 September, with studio filming for episode 1 beginning on 20 September at Lime Grove Studio D. Each episode would then be shot on successive Fridays. During the production of the final episode, photos of Faulkner, which were used as set dressing, had been stolen and were replaced by photos of Dunn, who looked similar to her. Stock footage of an early warning system was incorporated into episode 3 and episode 7 and 8 featured stock footage of missiles launching. The original shooting scripts included scenes that were not filmed due to time constraints, such as the UNIT raid to rescue Professor Watkins. Several scenes were also removed in the final edit, like Vaughn convincing Rutlidge to shoot himself, though both scenes would be restored in the novelisation. The serial ultimately cost £25,207 (equivalent to £385,505 in 2025) to produce, from a budget of £24,796 (equivalent to £379,219 in 2025); half of the episodes ran extremely overbudget, while the other half were extremely underbudget.

== Broadcast and reception ==
Episode	Title	Run time	Original release date	UK viewers (millions)	Appreciation Index
1	"Episode One"^{†}	24:32	2 November 1968	7.3	55
2	"Episode Two"	24:26	9 November 1968	7.1	53
3	"Episode Three"	23:44	16 November 1968	7.1	54
4	"Episode Four"^{†}	24:18	23 November 1968	6.4	51
5	"Episode Five"	23:25	30 November 1968	6.7	52
6	"Episode Six"	23:20	7 December 1968	6.5	56
7	"Episode Seven"	24:46	14 December 1968	7.2	55
8	"Episode Eight"	25:03	21 December 1968	7.0	53

^† Episode is missing

The Invasion was broadcast on BBC1 in eight weekly instalments from the 2 November until 21 November 1968 at the 5:15pm timeslot. Although the serial was intended to be premiered the week following The Mind Robber, coverage of the 1968 Summer Olympics delayed the airing by 2 weeks. The Invasion averaged 6.9 million viewers during its broadcast, which was continuing a slight upwards trend from the previous serial and a slight increase in audience appreciation. The serial was sold overseas to Australia and Hong Kong in 1970, Singapore in 1971 and Gibraltar in 1972. The copies sold to Australia faced censorship, with cuts being made to episodes 5, 6 and 7 to lower the age rating from A to G.

During the 1960s and 70s, BBC policy authorised the erasure of videotapes, in order to reuse them for other programmes. On 21 July 1969, episodes from many of the serials from Troughton's era were wiped, however The Invasion was one of the serials kept as an example of the run. All eight episodes of the serial were ordered to be wiped in May 1971, however most episodes, excluding episodes 5 and 6, were recorded to still have existed in the BBC's possession by 24 November 1976. When the BBC's library was formally audited in 1978 to be archived, episodes 1 and 4 were not retained, while all other episodes were preserved on 16 mm film. Very little visual material exists from the missing episodes, especially since no tele-snaps were taken, but their soundtracks survive, recorded off-air by fans at home.

=== Critical response ===
On the 6 November 1968, at a Review Board for the BBC, complaints about violence in the first episode were brought up, due to the lorry driver's death via gunshot, though the decision was defended by Head of Children's Programmes Monica Sims. Episode 4 was praised by BBC executives, including Aubrey Singer, at a meeting three weeks later. Paul Cornell, Martin Day, and Keith Topping in The Discontinuity Guide (1995) noted that the serial "shows the advantages of recognisable Earth settings" and described it as "an all action romp". In The Television Companion (1998), David J. Howe and Stephen James Walker wrote that The Invasion was "one of the very best stories to feature the Cybermen", with praise for Bartlett's costume design. Walker and Howe, alongside Mark Stammers, also gave the serial a unanimous 9/10 rating, citing the direction, script, acting and score as highlights. A review in the Morning Star praised the serial, due to its climax featuring a globalist theme of multiple countries teaming up to defeat the Cybermen. In 2013, Ben Lawrence of The Daily Telegraph named The Invasion as one of the top ten Doctor Who stories set in the contemporary time; in 2023, The Daily Telegraph named the serial as the overall 37th best story of the programme, praising the atmosphere and costume design. Robert Shearman and Toby Hadoke praised Camfield's directing and tone, with Hadoke highlighting Bartlett's design and Harper's score. Vanessa Bishop, in a review of the 2006 DVD release for Doctor Who Magazine, enjoyed the music and Camfield's direction. Andrew Blair of Den of Geek ranked the serial as the 5th best Cyberman story. Readers of Doctor Who Magazine have consistently ranked the serial among the top third of the Second Doctor's run (Note: Out of the Second Doctor's 21 stories, The Invasion was ranked 4th in 1998, 6th in 2009, 5th in 2014 and 4th in 2023 (barely missing out on 3rd).) and the top quarter of the entire programme. (Note: The Invasion was ranked 16th of 159 in 1998, 31st of 200 in 2009 and 33rd of 241 in 2014.)

The performances of several of the serial's actors have been praised by critics, especially Stoney's and his dynamic with Halliday. In The Doctors Are In: The Essential and Unofficial Guide to Doctor Who's Greatest Time Lord, Graeme Burk believed that Stoney and Coutney's characters had a "flair" to them, though lamented that the Brigadier felt different during the Third Doctor's run, despite the serial being a pilot to the era. The A.V. Club reviewer Christopher Bahn believed that the story was enjoyable, though also wrote that the Second Doctor felt out of place in a UNIT story. Ultimately, Bahn felt that the story was more about Vaughn than the Cybermen, as he felt they played a small part in the story, and highlighted Zoe's character, though also criticised the cut rescue of Professor Watkins. In 2009, Patrick Mulkern of Radio Times also praised the dynamic and characters of the Doctor, Jamie, and Zoe. Troughton and Hines' performances were also praised by Mark Clapham, Eddie Robson, and Jim Smith, along with Camfield's direction, which was compared to the James Bond films and Harry Palmer, though criticised Vaughn's plan and the "battle-of-the-sexes" between the Brigadier and Isobel. Shearman was highly critical of Isobel, whom he found to be an annoying character; Shearman additionally noted that Troughton, Padbury and Hines had minimal roles in the story. Brian J Robb of Total Sci-Fi Online also highlighted Stoney's performance and the character's team-up with the Doctor, with praise for the score.

The length of the serial has been criticised by some reviewers, but also praised by others. Bahn believed that the story's length led "an awful lot of contrivance, drawn-out scenes, and running back and forth". Literary critic John Kenneth Muir was highly critical of the serial, believing it to be too long and derivative of other serials, such as The Dalek Invasion of Earth (1964) and The Daleks' Master Plan (1965–66). Stacey Smith? opined that a long buildup showed the planning of the Cyberman invasion effectively, and that the four episodes before the reveal of the Cybermen were good. Burk disagreed, believing the first four episodes were uninteresting and that the serial is only effective in spite of the buildup. DVD Talk's Stuart Galbraith gave The Invasion a rating of three and a half stars out of five, noting that it borrowed from other science fiction tales and could have been shorter, but ultimately was entertaining and delivered an "atmospheric tale full of dread and high-tension suspense" with praise for Harper's music. Mulkern wrote that the story had "scarcely a dull moment", with the first four episodes "grippingly plotted" to lead up to the cliffhanger of the Cybermen. Bishop believed that the plot goes "round the houses a bit" and Mark Campbell gave the serial a 5/10, criticising its length, though praising Stoney's performance. Conversely, Howe commented that the serial "rarely gets boring", believing the cliffhangers to be strong. Fuller et al. also found that the length was beneficial, as it gives a "sense of mystery and anticipation".

=== Later usage ===
The Invasion is referenced in subsequent Cybermen stories. The serial Attack of the Cybermen (1985) references The Invasion with the Cybermen using the London sewers as a base. The two-part episode "Rise of the Cybermen" and "The Age of Steel" (2006) takes multiple elements from the serial, including the name International Electromatics and a businessman allying with the Cybermen. The Cybermen walking in front of St Paul's Cathedral would later be recreated for the documentary 30 Years in the TARDIS (1993) and the cliffhanger of "Dark Water" (2014). The serial's second episode mentions that the Cybermen recognise the Doctor and Jamie from Planet 14, hinting towards an untelevised adventure or an indirect reference to a previous one. Planet 14 would be elaborated on in the 1986 comic The World Shapers by Grant Morrison and the 1993 New Adventures novel Iceberg by David Banks, which offered differing explanations for the line's meaning. The former comic would also later be referenced in the episode "The Doctor Falls" (2017). The 1995 novels Millennial Rites and Original Sin also serve as sequels to the serial.

== Commercial releases ==
The Invasion
- Author: Ian Marter
- Cover artist: Andrew Skilleter
- Series: Doctor Who book: Target novelisations
- Release number: 98
- Publisher: W. H. Allen, Target Books
- Publication date: 16 May 1985
- ISBN: 0-426-20169-8

A novelisation of this serial, written by Ian Marter and featuring a cover painting by Andrew Skilleter, was published by W. H. Allen in May 1985. Marter disliked the Cybermen, despite having previously novelised Earthshock (1982), but novelised the story as Sherwin was unable to do so. In this novel the Russian Air Base is named as Nikortny, a nod to Courtney, with whom Marter was friends. The issue would be rereleased in paperback in October 1985 by Target Books and again in September 1993. An audiobook version of the novelisation, read by Patrick Troughton's son David, was released in 2016.

The story was released on VHS by BBC Video in June 1993, with the missing episodes 1 and 4 summarised on-screen by Nicholas Courtney, in segments written by John Nathan-Turner. The soundtracks for The Invasion and The Tenth Planet along with a bonus disc, The Origins of the Cybermen, an audio essay by David Banks, were released in a collector's tin called Doctor Who: Cybermen in November 2004. A CD audiobook, narrated by Frazer Hines, was released in 2006. For the programme's 60th anniversary, The Invasion was added to the BBC iPlayer alongside most other serials of Doctor Who's original run on 1 November 2023.

Merchandise based on The Invasion has also been released. Jondar International Promotions sold a phone card featuring a scene from The Invasion on it in 1995. Figurines of the Cybermen from the serial would be produced in 1997 by Harlequin, as part of the Age of Steel figurine set, and in 2014 by Eaglemoss. In 2004, a stamp cover signed by Padbury and Courtney and based on the serial was released by the Stamp Centre. In 2011, T-shirts, travel card holders and mugs featuring the Cybermen from the serial were sold by Titan Merchandise, Half Moon Bay and Wesco respectively.

=== Animated reconstruction ===
A scene from the animated reconstruction of the missing first episode, which was released alongside 2006 DVD of the serial, marking the first official animation of Doctor Who's missing episodes.

In June 2006, the BBC announced that the animation studio Cosgrove Hall, who previously created the webcast Scream of the Shalka, had produced full-length animated versions of the two missing episodes. The animation of The Invasion was the first official animation of missing episodes of Doctor Who. The project was done in black and white and 4:3, to match the still existing episodes, and animated in Adobe Flash. At the beginning of the project, the animation team only had the serial's audio, which was restored by Mark Ayres. From the audio, a loose script was created, although the team eventually received a shooting script from the BBC. The background were recreated by painting over clean frames of the backgrounds of surviving episodes, with the Doctor's movement being rotoscoped from surviving episodes or a body double. The animators were given some creative liberties, since they weren't required to use the limited pre-existing stills as key frames, which James Goss, the animation's producer, described as a "blessing".

These episodes, along with newly remastered copies of the rest of the serial, were released on DVD on 6 November 2006. Reviews of the animation were generally positive. Bahn stated that the animated episodes were effective, despite their simplicity. Burk felt that the animation could have been shorter, as the episodes animated had little substance; his co-author Smith? disagreed, believing the animations recaptured the serial's atmosphere to the point that "you forget you're watching an animated second Doctor." Bishop wrote that the animation was "jarring", but ultimately enjoyed the animation quality and film noir atmosphere. Shearsmith praised the artstyle of the animation, enjoying the details that added to the serial's tone, and highlighted the recreation of a helicopter stunt. Hadoke also praised the work, though believed that the original direction and score had assisted the animation's quality.

Although the project was successful, no future animations would be commissioned directly after The Invasion due to the limited budgets for DVD releases. The project would eventually followed up by an animated reconstruction of episodes of The Reign of Terror (1964) in 2013 by Planet 55 Studios.

=== Soundtrack ===
==== Re-recorded score ====
Cold Worlds

Soundtrack album by Don Harper
- Released: 6 June 2014
- Genre: Soundtrack
- Label: Dual Planet

Doctor Who soundtrack chronology
The 50th Anniversary Collection (2013)	''Cold Worlds'' (2014)	The Day of the Doctor/The Time of the Doctor (2014)

A re-recording of Don Harper's score for The Invasion was released 6 June 2014 on LP and CD by Dual Planet under the title Cold Worlds. Also included on the release are tracks by Harper used in Dawn of the Dead, and an arrangement of the Doctor Who theme music by Harper.

===== Track listing =====
All tracks are written by Don Harper, except where noted.

No.	Title	Length
1.	"Doctor Who Theme" (Ron Grainer arr. Don Harper)	4:36
2.	"Nightmare"	11:04
3.	"Moving Shadows"	1:51
4.	"Dank Earth"	1:43
5.	"Cold Worlds"	12:04
6.	"Psychosis"	1:54
7.	"Sinister Stranger"	1:58
8.	"Twisted Mind"	1:36
9.	"Troubled Mind – Torment"	2:34
Total length:		39:20

==== Original soundtrack ====
Doctor Who: The Invasion

Soundtrack album by Don Harper
- Released: 14 September 2018
- Recorded: 1968
- Genre: Soundtrack
- Length: 1:01:14
- Label: Silva Screen
- Producer: Mark Ayres

Doctor Who soundtrack chronology
Doctor Who: Series 9 (2018)	''Doctor Who: The Invasion'' (2018)	Doctor Who: The Five Doctors (2018)

Two of Harper's original tracks ("The Dark Side of the Moon" and "The Company") were included on the 4-disc edition of the album Doctor Who: The 50th Anniversary Collection, with the 11-disc edition containing an additional two ("Brigadier-Lethbridge Stewart" and "Mysteries"). The complete original soundtrack was released on CD and digitally on 14 September 2018, including Radiophonic effects by Brian Hodgson. It was released on vinyl on 28 September 2018, omitting some effects.

===== Track listing =====
All tracks are written by Don Harper, except where noted.

No.	Title	Length
1.	"Doctor Who (new opening theme, 1967)" (Ron Grainer arr. Delia Derbyshire at the BBC Radiophonic Workshop)	00:52
2.	"The Dark Side of the Moon (Music 2 Variation)"	00:33
3.	"The Company (Music 7)"	01:31
4.	"Hiding (Music 8)"	04:54
5.	"International Electromatics Headquarters (Music 3)"	00:16
6.	"Muzak" (John Baker at the BBC Radiophonic Workshop)	02:46
7.	"The Cyber Director (Music 5)"	00:08
8.	"The Cybermen, My Allies (Music 7)"	00:27
9.	"Brigadier Lethbridge-Stewart (Music 12a)"	01:22
10.	"Plans for Invasion (Music 8)"	01:25
11.	"Mysteries (Music 12)"	01:33
12.	"Fire Escape (Music 11)"	01:11
13.	"The Dark Side of the Moon (Reprise) (Music 2)"	00:31
14.	"The Cybermen, My Allies (Reprise) (Music 7, looped)"	01:07
15.	"Music 4 (Trapped in Gas Chamber – v. 1 & 2)"	01:29
16.	"Music 9"	02:20
17.	"Music 10"	02:00
18.	"Music 13"	00:05
19.	"Music 14"	00:15
20.	"Music 15a"	00:04
21.	"Music 15b"	00:20
22.	"Music 15c"	00:04
23.	"Music 15d"	00:20
24.	"Music 15e"	00:16
25.	"Music 15f"	00:04
26.	"Music 15g"	00:04
27.	"Music 15h"	00:23
28.	"Music 16a"	00:04
29.	"Music 16b"	00:05
30.	"Music 16c"	00:06
31.	"Music 16d"	00:07
32.	"Music 16e"	00:04
33.	"Music 16f"	00:08
34.	"Music 16g"	00:05
35.	"Part of TARDIS disappears" (Brian Hodgson at the BBC Radiophonic Workshop)	00:25
36.	"All of TARDIS disappears" (Brian Hodgson at the BBC Radiophonic Workshop)	00:24
37.	"TARDIS take off slow and painful" (Brian Hodgson at the BBC Radiophonic Workshop)	02:13
38.	"International Electromatics Headquarters Exterior" (Brian Hodgson at the BBC Radiophonic Workshop)	10:33
39.	"International Electromatics Headquarters Interior" (Brian Hodgson at the BBC Radiophonic Workshop)	06:26
40.	"Computer" (Brian Hodgson at the BBC Radiophonic Workshop)	00:21
41.	"Cyber Director Appears" (Brian Hodgson at the BBC Radiophonic Workshop)	01:01
42.	"Cyber Director Constant" (Brian Hodgson at the BBC Radiophonic Workshop)	02:37
43.	"Cyberman Brought to Life" (Brian Hodgson at the BBC Radiophonic Workshop)	02:26
44.	"Cyber Invasion" (Brian Hodgson at the BBC Radiophonic Workshop)	07:51
Total length:		01:01:14
