= Last of the Gaderene =

2000 novel by Mark Gatiss

- Author: Mark Gatiss
- Series: Doctor Who book: Past Doctor Adventures
- Release number: 28
- Subject: Featuring: Third Doctor; Jo, The Brigadier, Sergeant Benton, and UNIT
- Set in: Period between Speed of Flight and The Green Death
- Publisher: BBC Books
- Publication date: 3 January 2000
- Pages: 284
- ISBN: 0-563-55587-4
- Preceded by: Corpse Marker
- Followed by: Tomb of Valdemar

Last of the Gaderene is a BBC Books original novel written by Mark Gatiss and based on the long-running British science fiction television series Doctor Who. It features the Third Doctor, Jo Grant, Brigadier Lethbridge-Stewart, Sergeant Benton, Captain Mike Yates and other members of UNIT.

Last of the Gaderene was re-released in 2013 for the 50th Anniversary of Doctor Who.

== Plot ==
RAF Culverton, East Anglia, during the Second World War. Alec Whistler, a Spitfire pilot discovers a green crystal in the wreckage left by a bomb which destroyed the RAF base's Mess, killing his fiance...

As a reward for his actions in The Three Doctors the Third Doctor has had his knowledge of the TARDIS's dematerialisation codes returned to him by the Time Lords. The Doctor has left Earth and is helping the rebels on the planet Xanthos.

Meanwhile, back on Earth, the Brigadier has received a call from his old friend Wing Commander Alec Whistler. Culverton Aerodrome has closed and been purchased by the mysterious Legion International, led by the sinister Bliss. Black-shirted troops guard the base and have begun to terrorise the local residents, and people have begun to disappear. Investigating the base with the young Noah Bishop, Whistler is captured by Legion. Noah escapes, but is injured by a huge worm-like creature living in the marsh behind the aerodrome.

Escaping from Xanthos, the Doctor returns to UNIT HQ, realising this is the closest thing he has to home at the moment, though clearly unwilling to acknowledge this either to himself, Jo or the Brigadier. The Brigadier sends the Doctor and Jo to Culverton to investigate.

Arriving in Culverton, the Doctor and Jo are met by Whistler's housekeeper, Mrs. Toovey. While the Doctor investigates the base, Jo stays at Whistler's house, where she is attacked by a Legion trooper who is searching for the green crystal which Whistler has had since the War and which he regards as his lucky charm. Mrs. Toovey has concealed it in Whistler's restored Spitfire in a lead box, masking its energy signature from Bliss's sensors.

The kidnapped villagers begin to reappear, but acting curiously, and all grinning inanely. They are all carrying the embryos of the alien race the Gaderene in their mouths and are being controlled by the embryos.

The village fete is opened by Scotland Yard's Inspector Le Maitre (the Master in disguise) During the fete the remaining villagers are given embryos leaving the village a ghost town.

The Master has worked with the Gaderene to allow their invasion of Earth and despite Bliss's betrayal, still aims to help the invasion as he wishes to see mankind wiped out. Threatening Noah's life, the Master extorts the crystal from the Doctor. The crystal is the ninth and final key which will allow the Gaderene to cross over from their dying world to the Earth. Meanwhile, Whistler has escaped from his captors.

As the Gaderene ready their invasion force, the UNIT troops storm the airbase with the Doctor assisting in the borrowed Spitfire. The UNIT troops pin down the giant worm (Bliss's brother, whose genetic make-up was damaged in the crossing from the Gaderene homeworld) while the Doctor and the Master fight in the midst of the dimensional transference beam. The Master kills Bliss with his Tissue Compression Eliminator and is caught in the beam as it collapses, destroyed by Whistler's crashing Spitfire. The Gaderene are all destroyed and the Master seemingly destroyed with them.

Whistler survives, having ejected from the plane just in time and is reunited with his friend the Brigadier. The villagers with the implanted embryos are released and the embryos all die. The Doctor walks away, head bowed, expressing regret about the destruction.
