= Wartime (film) =

- Cover of the 1997 VHS reissue

Production
- Directed by: Keith Barnfather
- Written by: Andy Lane; Helen Stirling; Derrick Sherwin (characters)
- Produced by: Keith Barnfather; John Ainsworth (assistant)
- Music by: Mark Ayres
- Running time: 1 episode, 35 mins.
- First broadcast: 20 January 1988 (revised 1997)

Wartime is a 1988 direct-to-video science fiction film produced by Reeltime Pictures. It is the first professionally produced, authorized independent spin-off of the British television series Doctor Who, and the only such production to be made while the original run of the show was still on the air.

Produced and directed by Keith Barnfather and written by Andy Lane and Helen Stirling, Wartime follows Warrant Officer John Benton of the United Nations Intelligence Taskforce. During a mission for UNIT leader Brigadier Alistair Lethbridge-Stewart, Benton visits his childhood home where ghosts of the past rise up to haunt him. John Levene, who played Benton on Doctor Who off-and-on between 1968 and 1975, reprised the role for the film. In 1997, a revised version of the film was released, acknowledging in the credits for the first time a voice-only cameo by Nicholas Courtney as the Brigadier which had always been present in the film.

Although the British Broadcasting Corporation owns the rights to Doctor Who and its lead characters, Reeltime was able to obtain permission from Derrick Sherwin, creator of Benton and UNIT, to use both entities in this film so long as the Doctor was not mentioned. This set a precedent that led to further independently made spin-offs featuring former companions of the Doctor, and alien races from the show, which would be released over the following decade; ultimately an independent company, Big Finish Productions, would in the late 1990s receive a licence from the BBC to produce officially sanctioned Doctor Who-based productions.

== Plot ==
On his way to UNIT H.Q. by Land Rover to deliver some radioactive materials, Warrant Officer John Benton has an unexpected flashback to his childhood in Lancashire. After visiting the grave of his older brother Chris, Benton has a further flashback to his childhood in 1944. Later, having failed to contact UNIT successfully, Benton senses that there is potential trouble lurking nearby and orders his driver, Private Willis of the Regular Army, to repair the Land Rover while he himself investigates. Unbeknownst to both of them, there is a stranger lurking in the woods who aims to steal the radioactive material. As Benton wanders through the woods, he is further haunted by his childhood: it is revealed that Benton blames himself for the death of his older brother Christopher — while playing a game of chase, Christopher slipped off a wall and fell to his death. A ghostly entity, which takes the form of Benton's father, an army sergeant killed during the Second World War, torments Benton and tries to convince him that he is weak and unworthy of being in the army. Benton eventually breaks the hold over the spirit and realizes that his brother's death was an accident and that he was actually trying to save him. Returning to the Land Rover, having now exorcised his demons, Benton manages to subdue the mystery man who was attempting to steal the radioactive source. Benton and Willis take the man prisoner, leave the woods and resume their journey, while the voice of his father states that the game is now over.

== Background ==
In 1988, Wartime was first released on VHS. In 1997, Keith Barnfather revised the film — adding a voice-over with Nicholas Courtney as Brigadier Lethbridge-Stewart and released this version as well on VHS. The VHS also contained old video recordings of a Doctor Who Convention in London with Patrick Troughton, Colin Baker, Tom Baker, Jon Pertwee, and Peter Davison. In September 2015, the film was released on DVD

In this film it is the first time Sergeant Benton's first name John is mentioned on screen, it had been used in the 1983 book "A Celebration". Since then the name was used for Sergeant Benton in the media, by fans and in other Doctor Who releases. For example, the name John appears in the Big Finish audio play Council of War. Furthermore, it was used in a few novels which were produced by the BBC, for example in David A. McIntee's The Face of the Enemy, Paul Leonard's Genocide, Paul Cornell's No Future, Gary Russell's The Scales of Injustice, Keith Topping's The King of Terror, Tommy Donbavand's Shroud of Sorrow, Christopher Bulis' The Eye of the Giant, Mark Morris' Deep Blue or Simon Guerrier's Time Signature.

The fact Benton is a warrant officer, having been promoted in the first Fourth Doctor serial, Robot, places it after that serial, but presumably before his departure from UNIT in the late 1970s as revealed in the serial Mawdryn Undead.

== Cast ==
- John Levene as John Benton
- Michael Wisher as Father
- Mary Greenhalgh as Mother
- Paul Greenhalgh as Chris Benton
- Steven Stanley as Johnnie Benton
- Peter Noad as Private Willis
- Paul Flanagan as Man
- Nicholas Briggs as Soldier (uncredited)
- Nicholas Courtney as Brigadier Lethbridge-Stewart (voice-over; credited on revised 1997 release only)

== Novelisation ==
Wartime
- Author: Stephen James Walker
- Cover artist: Andrew-Mark Thompson
- Publisher: Telos Publishing
- Publication date: January 2023
- Pages: 101
- ISBN: 978-1-84583-209-4

A novelisation of this film by Stephen James Walker was published by Telos Publishing in January 2023.
