= Brigadier Lethbridge-Stewart =

Fictional character from Doctor Who and The Sarah Jane Adventures

- Doctor Who character
- Lethbridge-Stewart in Spearhead from Space
- First appearance: The Web of Fear (1968)
- Last appearance: "Survivors of the Flux" (2021)
- Created by: Mervyn Haisman; Henry Lincoln
- Portrayed by: Nicholas Courtney; Jeremiah Krage (Cyberman form in "Death in Heaven")
- Shared universe appearances: Downtime (1995); The Sarah Jane Adventures (2008)
- Non-canonical appearances: Dimensions in Time (1993)
- Duration: 1968–1975, 1983, 1989, 1993, 1995, 2008, 2014, 2021

In-universe information
- Full name: Alistair Gordon Lethbridge-Stewart
- Species: Human
- Gender: Male
- Affiliation: UNIT; Captain Mike Yates; Sergeant Benton; The Doctor; Second Doctor; Third Doctor; Fourth Doctor; Fifth Doctor; Seventh Doctor; Jo Grant; Sarah Jane Smith; Harry Sullivan
- Spouses: Fiona Lethbridge-Stewart (divorced); Doris Lethbridge-Stewart
- Children: Kate Lethbridge-Stewart (daughter)
- Relatives: Archibald Hamish Lethbridge-Stewart (grandfather); Gordon Lethbridge-Stewart (grandson)
- Home: Earth
- Nationality: British (English)
- Home era: 20th and 21st centuries

Sir Alistair Gordon Lethbridge-Stewart, generally referred to simply as the Brigadier, is a fictional character in the British science fiction television series Doctor Who, created by writers Mervyn Haisman and Henry Lincoln and played by Nicholas Courtney. He is one of the founders of UNIT (United Nations Intelligence Taskforce, later Unified Intelligence Taskforce), an international organisation that defends Earth from alien threats, and serves as commander of the British contingent. Presented at first as reluctant to accept the continuing aid of the Doctor, over time the Brigadier became one of the Doctor's greatest friends and his principal ally in defending Earth.

As one of the series' most prominent recurring characters over its history, the Brigadier appeared in 23 stories during the original run of Doctor Who, first appearing in the 1968 serial The Web of Fear opposite the Second Doctor (Patrick Troughton). The character made frequent appearances on the series following the introduction of the Third Doctor (Jon Pertwee) in 1970's Spearhead from Space. His final appearance in the program was in 1989's Battlefield opposite the Seventh Doctor (Sylvester McCoy). Nearly 20 years later, Courtney reprised the role in the DVD Special Feature called "Liberty Hall" in 2009 written by Karen Davies and directed by Brendan Sheppard in which the Brigadier was interviewed by a Times journalist. Then he finally appeared in the spin-off programme The Sarah Jane Adventures in 2008, his last appearance prior to Courtney's death in 2011. That year, Doctor Who later paid tribute to Courtney by announcing the Brigadier had died with a line of dialogue in "The Wedding of River Song". Later still, a Cyberman avatar of the Brigadier also appears, and achieves some closure with the Twelfth Doctor (Peter Capaldi), in "Death in Heaven" (2014).

The 2012 episode "The Power of Three" introduced the Brigadier's daughter, new UNIT chief Kate Stewart (Jemma Redgrave). The character was originally created in the video spin-off Downtime in 1995, in which the Brigadier also appeared. Kate became a recurring character on the series, making appearances alongside every Doctor from the Tenth to the Fifteenth.

== Character history ==
Alistair Gordon Lethbridge-Stewart's ancestry goes back to Scotland, according to dialogue in Terror of the Zygons (1975). He first encounters the Second Doctor in The Web of Fear (1968), when Lethbridge-Stewart is a lieutenant-colonel in the Scots Guards commanding a British Army detachment sent to investigate the Yeti in the London Underground. By his next appearance in The Invasion (1968), he had been promoted to brigadier and was working with UNIT. When the Doctor was forcibly regenerated and exiled to Earth, Lethbridge-Stewart gave him a position as UNIT's scientific advisor after he helped defeat the Auton invasion. Other military members of UNIT included Captain Mike Yates, Sergeant Benton and Royal Navy Lieutenant Harry Sullivan.

Most of the stories about the Third Doctor were set on Earth and feature UNIT and the Brigadier heavily. While not as ubiquitous in following years, he appeared alongside every subsequent Doctor in the original television series run, excluding the Sixth Doctor, with whom he appeared only in the 30th anniversary special, Dimensions in Time in 1993. Although Lethbridge-Stewart first met the Doctor in his second incarnation, he also met and worked with the First Doctor in the opening serial of the 10th anniversary season, The Three Doctors and again in the 20th-anniversary special, "The Five Doctors". He eventually retired from the military to teach mathematics at an English public school in 1976, as seen in Mawdryn Undead (1983). The Brigadier and the Sixth Doctor, as well as later incarnations of the Doctor, have been paired in numerous spin-off productions (see Other appearances).

As one of the most popular recurring supporting characters in the television series, the Brigadier is often listed among the Doctor's companions. He is listed as such by the BBC and is included in a book by John Nathan-Turner's (a former producer of Doctor Who) discussing all the Doctor's companions.

Lethbridge-Stewart's last appearance in a Doctor Who television episode was in 1989, in the Seventh Doctor serial Battlefield. Called out of retirement to deal with an other-dimensional invasion of armoured knights led by Morgaine, he found himself once again at the Doctor's side. Lethbridge-Stewart served as his world's champion as he faced down and killed the demonic Destroyer of Worlds armed only with his service revolver and a load of silver-tipped bullets. (Battlefield was stated to be a few years into Ace's future but not a specific date. The Virgin New Adventures books place it in 1997.)

Little was shown of Lethbridge-Stewart's life outside UNIT in the television series. Planet of the Spiders referred to a relationship with a woman called Doris. By Battlefield, he was married to her (played by Angela Douglas). It was Courtney's own belief that the Brigadier had been in a previous marriage to a woman named Fiona, and that he and Doris were having an affair; his first marriage ended due to his work.

Although Lethbridge-Stewart never appeared in the revived series, the character is still alive during the Tenth Doctor's tenure. In the spin-off programme The Sarah Jane Adventures story Revenge of the Slitheen, Sarah Jane Smith says to "give [her] love to the Brig". In the Tenth Doctor episode "The Poison Sky", the Doctor mentions that he could use the help of "the Brigadier". He is then told that "Sir Alistair" is "stranded in Peru", indicating that the Brigadier has been knighted by this time. The first film footage from the classic era to appear in the revived era was his photograph displayed in the slow pan across Sarah's attic in the opening scene of The Sarah Jane Adventures' première, Invasion of the Bane.

In 2008, Courtney again reprised the role in a The Sarah Jane Adventures story, Enemy of the Bane, and confirmed his knighthood repeatedly: Major Kilburne and Sarah Jane each address him as "Sir Alistair" and he later introduces himself fully as "Brigadier Sir Alistair Gordon Lethbridge-Stewart" to Mrs. Wormwood. This episode refers back to the Peru mission as there is mention of him being de-briefed about it. Sarah Jane asks Lethbridge-Stewart to assist her in accessing UNIT's "Black Archive", a top secret alien artefact facility first alluded to by Douglas Cavendish to Sir Alistair's daughter in Dæmos Rising. Sarah Jane prefers to avoid seeking official clearance, to avoid awkward questions about Luke, her artificially-grown son. In his old age, the Brigadier has developed a dislike for the new way UNIT works and often refers to events that happened in "his day". He walks with a walking stick now, but is seen driving a Bentley T-series to UNIT's "Black Archive". His wife (presumably Doris) is mentioned in this episode. The Brigadier assists Sarah Jane and Rani in escaping UNIT and later confronts a Bane disguised as a UNIT officer, shooting him dead with a gun hidden within his cane.

In The Sarah Jane Adventures story The Wedding of Sarah Jane Smith, Clyde Langer tells Peter Dalton that the Brigadier cannot make it to the wedding because he is back in Peru. It had been intended by the production team that Lethbridge-Stewart would indeed appear in the story and meet the Tenth Doctor, but Courtney was recovering from a stroke and unable to take part. He is reported to be in Peru for a third time in Death of the Doctor (2010). Clyde describes him as being Sarah Jane's oldest friend; Sarah Jane met both the Doctor and Sir Alistair in the first episode of the Third Doctor serial, The Time Warrior (1974).

In 2009, Courtney reprised the role for a final time in the short film Liberty Hall, an extra for Mawdryn Undead's DVD release. The film is a seven-minute mockumentary where a fictional journalist interviews the Brigadier about his life. The Brigadier discusses his marriages with Fiona and Doris, and mentions his daughter Kate and grandson Gordon (referencing Downtime). He states that his most recent encounter with the Doctor took place in 2000, when he was on unofficial UNIT business in Malebolgia in the United States (referencing the Eighth Doctor audio drama Minuet in Hell). He concludes, "So, now I've hung up my uniform for good... unless I hear that a blue police box has been found somewhere, and then, don't you worry, I'll be ready!"

Sometime later, the Brigadier becomes ill and is moved into a nursing home. In 2011's "The Wedding of River Song", the Eleventh Doctor rings the nursing home to have the Brigadier made ready for a trip; a nurse regretfully informs him that the Brigadier died peacefully "a few months ago" and had spoken well of him often, insisting a glass always be kept ready for him in case he turned up. The Doctor is visibly shattered by the news, which forces him to realise that he can't avoid his predestined death.

In the 2014 episode "Death in Heaven", Missy (the regenerated female Master) resurrects the Earth's dead as flight-capable Cybermen. The Brigadier's daughter Kate is apparently killed falling from a plane during a Cybermen attack. Overcoming his programming, the converted Danny Pink commands the Cybermen to sacrifice themselves to thwart Missy's plan. The Doctor prepares to execute Missy, but is preempted by a lone surviving Cyberman, who seemingly vaporizes her with a forearm-mounted ray-gun. Finding that the Cyberman has rescued Kate, the Doctor realizes it is the converted Brigadier, saying "Of course! Earth's darkest hour, and mine. Where else would you be?" Overcome with emotion, the Doctor salutes him – something Kate said her father had always wanted – and the Brigadier fires his leg jets and flies away. What happens to him afterward is left unknown.

In the 2017 Christmas special "Twice Upon a Time", the First and Twelfth Doctors unwittingly intervene when Testimony, an organization in the far future that collect memories from those about to die, retrieve a seemingly-innocuous captain in the First World War from the moment before his death, the temporal anomaly of the two Doctors resisting their imminent regenerations disrupting Testimony's efforts to return the captain to his scheduled death. The Doctors are able to bend the rules and return the captain to a point a couple of hours after he was taken out of time, in time for his life to be saved by the Christmas truce. Before he returns to time, the captain reveals that his name is Archibald Hamish Lethbridge-Stewart, suggesting that he is a relative of the Brigadier. Although not confirmed on-screen, Gatiss later confirmed in an interview with Radio Times that the character is one of the Brigadier's grandfathers.

=== List of television appearances ===
- The Web of Fear (1968)
- The Invasion (1968)
- Spearhead from Space (1970)
- Doctor Who and the Silurians (1970)
- The Ambassadors of Death (1970)
- Inferno (1970) (alternate version also depicted)
- Terror of the Autons (1971)
- The Mind of Evil (1971)
- The Claws of Axos (1971)
- Colony in Space (1971)
- The Dæmons (1971)
- Day of the Daleks (1972)
- The Time Monster (1972)
- The Three Doctors (1972–73)
- The Green Death (1973)
- The Time Warrior (1973–74)
- Invasion of the Dinosaurs (1974)
- Planet of the Spiders (1974)
- Robot (1974–75)
- Terror of the Zygons (1975)
- Mawdryn Undead (1983) (alternate version also depicted)
- "The Five Doctors" (1983)
- Battlefield (1989)
- Dimensions in Time (1993)
- "The Day of the Doctor" (2013) (pictured)
- "Death in Heaven" (2014) (Cyberman & pictured)
- "Survivors of the Flux" (2021) (archival audio)
- "Lucky Day" (2025) (pictured)

The Sarah Jane Adventures

- "Invasion of the Bane" (2007) (pictured)
- Enemy of the Bane (2008)

== Other appearances ==
The Brigadier and the Sixth Doctor were paired in the two-part charity special Dimensions in Time and the Big Finish audio play, The Spectre of Lanyon Moor. The Sixth Doctor also meets the Brigadier in the novel Business Unusual, also purporting to be the first meeting of the two characters, subsequently working together in The Shadow in the Glass to track down the newly discovered Fourth Reich; in the short story "Brief Encounter: A Wee Deoch an..?", written by Sixth Doctor actor Colin Baker and published in Doctor Who Magazine Winter Special, 1991, they cross paths but neither realises it. The Brigadier has also appeared with the Eighth Doctor in the novel The Eight Doctors by Terrance Dicks (set after the events of the TV Movie and during moments of The Doctors' past lives) in audio plays and the novels The Dying Days and The Shadows of Avalon. The Tenth Doctor met the Brigadier in the Doctor Who Magazine comic The Warkeeper's Crown.

The Brigadier and his family have made several appearances in the spin-off media. The spin-off UNIT videos Downtime and Dæmos Rising feature Kate Lethbridge-Stewart, the Brigadier's daughter from his marriage to his first wife, Fiona (first named in the Missing Adventure The Scales of Injustice by Gary Russell). Also appearing was Kate's young son, Gordon Lethbridge-Stewart. Kate also played her UNIT role in the fiftieth anniversary episode, "The Day of the Doctor" (2013).

The novels also gave Lethbridge-Stewart another offspring. While on duty in Sierra Leone as a young lieutenant, Lethbridge-Stewart met and was intimate with a local girl named Mariatu, the daughter of a village chief, and unknown to Lethbridge-Stewart, she had a son. This was first hinted at in Ben Aaronovitch's novelisation of his 1988 serial Remembrance of the Daleks, which featured quotes from a fictional history of UNIT (The Zen Military) written by a Kadiatu Lethbridge-Stewart (Mariatu's granddaughter) in 2006. In the 1992 New Adventures novel Transit (also by Aaronovitch, and set in the 22nd Century), the Seventh Doctor meets the adopted daughter of General Yembe Lethbridge-Stewart, one of Mariatu's descendants. This daughter, also named Kadiatu Lethbridge-Stewart, went on to become a recurring character in the New Adventures.

The novels have also fleshed out the Brigadier's ancestry, establishing that he comes from a long-standing military family. In the New Adventures novel The Dying Days by Lance Parkin, he talks about three ancestors who reached the rank of general. One, William Lethbridge-Stewart, was in the retinue of James VI of Scotland and I of England. The other two fought at Naseby and Waterloo. The Scales of Injustice names the latter as Major-General Fergus Lethbridge-Stewart. The Brigadier also says in The Dying Days that his father died in World War II, fighting alongside Field-Marshal Montgomery in Africa.

The Past Doctor Adventures novel The Wages of Sin by David A. McIntee established that the Brigadier had an ancestor named Alastair Lethbridge-Stewart who worked for the British Government in 1916. Deadly Reunion by Terrance Dicks and Barry Letts establishes that the Brigadier was a Second Lieutenant serving in Army Intelligence in 1944, although this makes the Brigadier older than other stories would suggest.

In the novels, Lethbridge-Stewart emerged from retirement again during the events of The Dying Days where he dealt with an invasion of Ice Warriors from Mars in 1997. At the end of that novel he was promoted to General. Lethbridge-Stewart was subsequently rejuvenated with alien technology in Happy Endings by Paul Cornell, taking place in 2010. The rejuvenated Lethbridge-Stewart, widowed as a result of an accident at sea but back with the military, next appeared in the BBC Books Eighth Doctor Adventures novel The Shadows of Avalon, also by Cornell, where he still held the rank of General but preferred to be called "the Brigadier". According to The King of Terror by Keith Topping, Lethbridge-Stewart eventually passes away in the early 2050s.

Courtney played the Brigadier in two BBC Radio 4 Doctor Who plays set during the Third Doctor's era, The Paradise of Death (1993) and The Ghosts of N-Space (1996), alongside Pertwee and Elisabeth Sladen as Sarah Jane Smith. For Big Finish, he has played the part of Lethbridge-Stewart in several plays, with Minuet in Hell revealing that he played a role in the establishment of the Scottish Parliament and also that he does covert work for the UN as a plausibly deniable agent. He also played an alternate universe version of the Brigadier in the Doctor Who Unbound play Sympathy for the Devil, opposite David Warner as the Doctor and David Tennant (later cast as the Tenth Doctor) as Colonel Brimmecombe-Wood. At the conclusion of Sympathy, the alternate Brigadier- referred to as 'Alistair'- joins Warner's Doctor as his companion, but after an unspecified amount of time travelling together, they part ways in the later audio Masters of War, when the two arrive on Skaro and force the Daleks and the Thals to join forces to fight off an invasion by a race known as the Quatch, Alistair remaining once the Quatch are defeated to help the two sides maintain their new truce.

Courtney also voiced the Brigadier in the 2001 webcast Death Comes to Time.

In December 2004, Big Finish released the first of a series of UNIT-based audio plays, where General Sir Alistair Lethbridge-Stewart acted as a consultant to a new generation of officers and by series' end became UNIT's new Scientific Advisor. If the events in this series are to be reconciled with the books, these plays would seem to take place between the events of The Dying Days and Happy Endings, as this version of Lethbridge-Stewart does not seem to be rejuvenated. Also, the public does not believe in existence of aliens, which would appear to place it before the events of "The Christmas Invasion".

In the Doctor Who Magazine comic strip story Warkeeper's Crown (DWM #378–380), Lethbridge-Stewart made a reappearance alongside the Tenth Doctor after being kidnapped by Warlords as a tactical commander. He was an old officer stationed at Sandhurst.

A series of novels featuring the young Colonel Lethbridge-Stewart has been published by Candy Jar Books since 2015. The novels are licensed by the literary estate of co-creator Mervyn Haisman and endorsed by Henry Lincoln.

In 2017, The Third Doctor Adventures- Volume Five features Jon Culshaw acting as the Brigadier in a series of audios set during the Third Doctor's era.

In The Legacy of Time, a special six-part audio to celebrate Big Finish's twentieth anniversary of producing Doctor Who-related audios, the story The Sacrifice of Jo Grant sees Jo Grant and Kate Stewart of the present day being sent back to the 1970s by a series of temporal rifts, where they meet the Third Doctor as he investigates the anomalies in his time. While Kate attempts to avoid introducing herself to limit the risk of a paradox, the Doctor realizes her identity and convinces her to call her father, introducing herself as the commander of UNIT in the future without identifying herself by name, with the Brigadier (voiced by Jon Culshaw once again) telling her that he is assured that the future of UNIT is in good hands.

=== List of other appearances ===
==== Video ====
- Wartime (voice only)
- Downtime (novelised by scriptwriter Marc Platt as part of the Virgin Missing Adventures line)
- Death Takes a Holiday
- The Crystal Conundrum (voice only)
- The Pair o' Docs Paradox
- Twice Upon a Timelord
- Liberty Hall

==== Audio dramas ====
===== BBC Radio =====
- The Paradise of Death (novelised by scriptwriter Barry Letts as part of the Target Books novelisation line)
- The Ghosts of N-Space (novelised by scriptwriter Barry Letts as part of the Virgin Missing Adventures line)

===== Big Finish Productions =====
- The Spectre of Lanyon Moor (with the Sixth Doctor and Evelyn Smythe)
- Minuet in Hell (with the Eighth Doctor and Charley Pollard)
- Zagreus (the TARDIS creates a holographic projection in the form of the Brigadier)
- Sympathy for the Devil (Doctor Who Unbound series, out of normal Doctor Who continuity; travels with an alternate Third Doctor)
- Masters of War (Doctor Who Unbound series, out of normal Doctor Who continuity; leaves an alternate Third Doctor after facing an alternate Davros and the Daleks)
- UNIT: The Coup
- UNIT: Time Heals
- UNIT: The Wasting
- The Blue Tooth (adventure related by the character Liz Shaw)
- Old Soldiers
- The Doll of Death (adventure related by the character Jo Grant)
- The Three Companions
- The Magician's Oath (adventure related by the character Captain Mike Yates)
- The Mega (adventure related by the characters Jo Grant & Captain Mike Yates)
- Shadow of the Past (adventure related by the character Liz Shaw)
- The Many Deaths of Jo Grant (adventure related by the character Jo Grant)
- The Rings of Ikiria (adventure related by the character Captain Mike Yates)
- The Last Post (adventure related by the character Liz Shaw)
- The Third Doctor Adventures: Volume Five (portrayed by Jon Culshaw)
- The Legacy of Time: The Sacrifice of Jo Grant (cameo appearance; portrayed by Jon Culshaw)
- Way of the Burryman/The Forth Generation (portrayed by Jon Culshaw)

===== BBCi webcast =====
- Death Comes to Time

===== Short Trips audios =====
- Walls of Confinement

==== Novels ====
===== The Companions of Doctor Who =====
- Harry Sullivan's War by Ian Marter

===== Virgin New Adventures =====
- Blood Heat by Jim Mortimore (parallel universe version of the Brigadier)
- No Future by Paul Cornell
- Happy Endings by Paul Cornell
- The Dying Days by Lance Parkin

===== Virgin Missing Adventures =====
- Dancing the Code by Paul Leonard
- The Eye of the Giant by Christopher Bulis
- The Scales of Injustice by Gary Russell

===== Virgin sidestep novel =====
- Who Killed Kennedy by David Bishop

===== Eighth Doctor Adventures =====
- The Eight Doctors by Terrance Dicks
- The Shadows of Avalon by Paul Cornell

===== Past Doctor Adventures =====
- The Devil Goblins from Neptune by Martin Day and Keith Topping (Third Doctor, Liz, Benton & Yates)
- Business Unusual by Gary Russell (Sixth Doctor & Mel)
- The Face of the Enemy by David A. McIntee (Third Doctor's era; works with Benton, Yates, Ian, Barbara and the Master in the absence of the Third Doctor and Jo)
- Deep Blue by Mark Morris (set in the Third Doctor's era but working with the Fifth, Tegan & Turlough; also Benton & Yates)
- Last of the Gaderene by Mark Gatiss (Third Doctor, Jo, Benton & Yates)
- Verdigris by Paul Magrs (Third Doctor, Jo, Benton & Yates)
- The King of Terror by Keith Topping (Fifth Doctor, Tegan & Turlough)
- Rags by Mick Lewis (Third Doctor, Jo, Benton & Yates)
- The Shadow in the Glass by Justin Richards and Stephen Cole (Sixth Doctor)
- Deadly Reunion by Terrance Dicks and Barry Letts (Third Doctor, Jo, Benton & Yates)
- Island of Death by Barry Letts (Third Doctor, Jo, Benton & Yates)

===== Lethbridge-Stewart =====
- The Forgotten Son by Andy Frankham-Allen
- The Schizoid Earth by David A McIntee
- Beast of Fang Rock by Andy Frankham-Allen (based on an idea by Terrance Dicks)
- Mutually Assured Domination by Nick Walters
- Moon Blink by Sadie Miller
- The Showstoppers by Jonathan Cooper
- The Grandfather Infestation by John Peel
- Times Squared by Rick Cross
- Blood of Atlantis by Simon A. Forward
- Mind of Stone by Iain McLaughlin
- Night of the Intelligence by Andy Frankham-Allen
- The Daughters of Earth by Sarah Groenewegen
- The Dreamer's Lament by Benjamin Burford-Jones
- A Very Private Haunting by Sharon Bidwell
- The New Unusual by Adrian Sherlock and Andy Frankham-Allen
- The Man From Yesterday by Nick Walters
- The Laughing Gnome: Scary Monsters by Simon A. Forward
- The Laughing Gnome: Fear of The Web by Alyson Leeds
- The Laughing Gnome: The Danger Men by Nick Walters
- The Laughing Gnome: Rise of The Dominator by Robert Mammone
- The Laughing Gnome: Lucy Wilson and The Bledoe Cadets by Tim Gambrell
- The Laughing Gnome: On His Majesty's National Service by John Peel
- Bloodlines: Home Fires Burn by Gareth Madgwick
- Bloodlines: The Shadowman by Sharon Bidwell
- Bloodlines: An Ordinary Man by Andy Frankham-Allen and Tim Gambrell
- Bloodlines: The George Kostinen Mystery by Chris Lynch
- Bloodlines: Foreword to the Past by Baz Greenland
- I, Alistair by Robert Mammone
- Domination Game by Alyson Leeds and Megan Fizell
- Fear Frequency by George Ivanoff
- The Haunting of Gabriel Chase by British author Andrew Allen
- Warriors of Montu by Gareth Madgwick
- The Overseers by James Middleditch
- Blue Blood by Australian author Chris Thomas
- A Most Haunted Man by Sarah Groenewegen
- Legacy of the Dominator by Nick Walters
- The Hiraeth Embrace by James Middleditch
- Spheres of Influence by Violet Addison and David N. Smith

==== The Lucy Wilson Mysteries ====
- Avatars of The Intelligence by Sue Hampton
- Curse of The Mirror Clowns by Chris Lynch
- The Midnight People by John Peel
- The Bandril Invasion by Wink Taylor
- The Brigadier and The Bledoe Cadets by Tim Gambrell

==== Novellas ====
- The Life of Evans by John Peel
- The Flaming Soldier by Christopher Bryant
- The Lost Skin by Andy Frankham-Allen

==== Anthologies ====
- The HAVOC Files
- The HAVOC Files 2
- The HAVOC Files 3
- The HAVOC Files 4
- The Lethbridge-Stewart Short Story Collection
- Lineage
- The Lethbridge-Stewart Short Story Collection 2
- The HAVOC Files 2 - Special Edition
- The HAVOC Files: The Laughing Gnome
- The HAVOC Files: Loose Ends
- The Lucy Wilson Mysteries: Christmas Crackers
- The HAVOC Files 3 - Special Edition

==== Short stories ====
- "Brief Encounter—Listening Watch" by Dan Abnett (Doctor Who Magazine Winter Special 1991)
- "Brief Encounter: A Wee Deoch an..?" by Colin Baker (Doctor Who Magazine Winter Special 1991)
- "The Straw that Broke the Camel's Back" by Vanessa Bishop (Decalog)
- "Where the Heart Is" by Andy Lane (Decalog 2: Lost Property)
- "UNITed We Fall" by Keith R.A. DeCandido (Decalog 3: Consequences)
- "Freedom" by Steve Lyons (Short Trips)
- "Degrees of Truth" by David A. McIntee (Short Trips audio book, read by Nicholas Courtney)
- "Honest Living" by Jason Loborik (More Short Trips)
- "Still Lives" by Ian Potter (Short Trips: Zodiac)
- "The Switching" by Simon Guerrier (Short Trips: Zodiac)
- "Hidden Talent" by Andrew Spokes (Short Trips: Companions)
- "An Overture Too Early" by Simon Guerrier (Short Trips: The Muses)
- "UNIT Christmas Parties: First Christmas" by Nick Wallace (Short Trips: A Christmas Treasury)
- "UNIT Christmas Parties: Christmas Truce" by Terrance Dicks (Short Trips: A Christmas Treasury)
- "UNIT Christmas Parties: Ships That Pass" by Karen Dunn (Short Trips: A Christmas Treasury)
- "Faithful Friends" by Mark Wright & Cavan Scott (Short Trips: The Ghosts of Christmas)
- "The Ambush" by Andy Frankham-Allen (Doctor Who Magazine, Lethbridge-Stewart: The HAVOC Files)
- "Cowpats and Comfort" by Tim Gambrell (The Lethbridge-Stewart Quiz Book (Exclusive Edition))

==== Comics ====
- "The Arkwood Experiments" by John Canning (TV Comic 944–949)
- "The Multi-Mobile!" by John Canning (TV Comic 950–954)
- "Insect" by John Canning (TV Comic 955–959)
- "The Metal Eaters" by John Canning (TV Comic 960–964)
- "The Fishmen of Carpantha" by John Canning (TV Comic 965–969)
- "Doctor Who and the Rocks from Venus" by John Canning (TV Comic 970–976)
- "Assassin from Space" by Patrick Williams (TV Comic Holiday Special 1970)
- "Undercover" by Patrick Williams (TV Comic Holiday Special 1970)
- "Castaway" by John Canning (TV Comic Annual 1971)
- "Levitation" by John Canning (TV Comic Annual 1971)
- "Fogbound" by Frank Langford (Doctor Who Holiday Special 1973)
- "Secret of the Tower" by Alex Badia (Doctor Who Holiday Special 1973)
- "Doomcloud" (Doctor Who Holiday Special 1974)
- "The Time Thief" by Steve Livesey (Doctor Who Annual 1974)
- "Menace of the Molags" by Steve Livesey (Doctor Who Annual 1974)
- "Dead on Arrival" by Edgar Hodges (Doctor Who Annual 1975)
- "The Man in the Ion Mask" by Dan Abnett and Brian Williamson (Doctor Who Magazine Winter Special 1991)
- "Change of Mind" by Kate Orman and Barrie Mitchell (Doctor Who Magazine 221–223)
- "Target Practice" by Gareth Roberts and Adrian Salmon (Doctor Who Magazine 234)
- "Final Genesis" by Warwick Gray and Colin Andrew (Doctor Who Magazine 203: cameo appearance in parallel universe)
- "Mark of Mandragora" by Dan Abnett (Doctor Who Magazine 167–172: has a small role as most of the UNIT leader's role is carried out by Muriel Frost)
- "The Warkeeper's Crown" by Alan Barnes (Doctor Who Magazine 378–380)
- "The Forgotten" by Tony Lee (writer) and Pia Guerra (artist) (IDW Publishing Issue #2: has a small part in the Third Doctor's segment)
- "Prisoners of Time" by Scott and David Tipton. Issue three and issue twelve.

== References outside of Doctor Who ==
The character also appears briefly in a cameo role at the end of writer Paul Cornell's novelisation of the 1997 ITV science-fiction serial The Uninvited. Although the character is not named in the book, the description is that of Lethbridge-Stewart and Cornell later admitted that this was indeed his intention.

Marvel Comics' Excalibur featured an organisation called W.H.O. (the Weird Happenings Organisation) run by a Brigadier Alysande Stuart. Her twin brother Alistaire was WHO's "scientific advisor" (the role the Doctor had in UNIT). A character named "Brigadier Lethbridge-Stewart" had earlier appeared in three panels of Uncanny X-Men #218, supervising the arrest of the Juggernaut in Edinburgh, where he also calls out to a "Sergeant-Major Benton" at one point.

The Sherlock Holmes novel Waters of Death by Kel Richards features a naval commander called Ralph Lethbridge-Stewart, alongside Captain Harry Sullivan and Lieutenant Philip Benton. It is set in the same fictional location as the Doctor Who story Terror of the Zygons.

An unnamed army brigadier, who looks and acts very similar to Lethbridge-Stewart, appears in the comic strip Caballistics, Inc. He first appeared in the story Going Underground, where he is in charge of the army's response following a demon invasion of the London Underground; a member of his SAS team refers to "bloody robot yetis" having been down there once. He shows up again in the story Ashes, in charge of the military response to a devastating attack on Glasgow. This character is one of several references to both the Doctor Who universe and other sci-fi/horror properties in Caballistics.

Although unnamed, two characters strongly resembling Lethbridge-Stewart and Sergeant Benton (who was specifically named) appear in the John M. Ford Star Trek novel How Much for Just the Planet? at a rather treacherous golf course on the planet Direidi.

Similarly to Alysande Stuart, the comic book Jack Staff includes Commander Liz Stewart of S.M.I.L.E. (Secret Military Intelligence Lethal Executive).

The Brigadier briefly appears in Kim Newman and Eugene Byrne's Back in the USSA, supporting Britain's involvement in an alternate Vietnam War.

The Brigadier was referenced in name in the ABC Family show The Middleman. In the episode "The Clotharian Contamination Protocol", Wendy and The Middleman go to check out a returned Voyager probe. However, a nearby NASA listening station team also arrives. Using their random IDs, and due to the quick thinking of the Middleman, they are intimidated into leaving. As they go, the Middleman calls out the other team's lead, "Mr... Lethbridge-Stewart, if that is your real name!"

== See also ==
- United Nations Intelligence Taskforce
- UNIT dating controversy
- List of Doctor Who supporting characters
