= Don Harper =

Australian composer (1921–1999)

William Donald Harper (18 March 1921 – 30 May 1999) was an Australian jazz violinist and composer. Harper was best known for his compositions for British TV shows, including World of Sport, Champion House, and the Doctor Who story The Invasion. Often a regular on radio and TV music shows in both the UK and Australia, Harper recorded many albums as a solo performer or as leader of a band. Later in life, he would serve as the Head of Jazz Studies at Wollongong University.

== Early years ==
Harper was born in Seddon, Victoria on 18 March 1921. He learned to play the violin, when he was 8, despite his father disliking the instrument. He was taught classical violin by Reg Bradley, a member of the Melbourne Symphony Orchestra, following a radio talent show. Harper began live performances at the age of 9 and became a band leader at 15. In the 1930s, Harper became interested in jazz, with Duke Ellington, Joe Venuti, Quintette du Hot Club de France, Stuff Smith, Roy Eldridge and Coleman Hawkins all serving as inspirations. By the mid-1940s, his band Don Harper and his Music were drawing big crowds in the Melbourne area. A decade of non-stop work led to his quartet winning a talent show in 1954 and provided funds for the next step in his career.

== Career ==
=== First period in the UK (1955–1962) ===
Following an invitation from British comedian Tommy Trinder, whom he met while touring Australia, Harper moved to the UK in 1955, and became a regular performer, as leader of a quartet or sextet, on many BBC Radio shows including Music While You Work, Workers' Playtime, and Midday Music Hall. He also worked as a solo violinist at cabaret clubs, as a session musician in recording studios, and conducted the orchestra at the nightclub The Talk of the Town.

In 1956, The Don Harper Quartette released the Hot Fiddle album on Planet subsidiary, Constellation CMG 101.

=== Return to Australia (1962–1966) ===
Returning to Australia in 1962, Harper was regularly seen performing on Australian television and on radio as well as in many jazz clubs across the country. He also toured alongside the Dave Brubeck Quartet. It was during this period that he studied musical composition with Raymond Hanson at the New South Wales State Conservatorium of Music at the University of Sydney, and this shaped the next part of his career.

=== Second period in the UK (1966–1983) ===
When Harper returned to the UK, the composition of music became the focus of his work. He wrote themes for TV shows including LWT's long-running World of Sport, BBC drama series Champion House, and Rediffusion's Sexton Blake. He also wrote incidental music for TV shows, including the Doctor Who serial The Invasion in 1968, and BBC science fiction/horror series Out Of The Unknown in 1969. His music composition also included tracks for production music label KPM (sometimes credited as "Don Jackson"). In 1972 he collaborated with Delia Derbyshire and Brian Hodgson of the BBC Radiophonic Workshop (both recording under pseudonyms), on a KPM album of electronic music. A further exploration of electronic music led to the 1974 album Don Harper's Homo Electronicus (UK, EMI Columbia) on which Harper collaborated with a group of musicians including jazz keyboardist Alan Branscombe playing the ARP 2600. The album contains a re-working of Harper's own composition "World of Sport". In the late 1970s he teamed up with British jazz guitarist Denny Wright, recording albums and appearing on BBC radio shows including “Sounds of Jazz”. Another project, which combined his musical skills with art and classic fiction, came in 1978, when he composed a series of songs to illustrate the Lewis Carroll Alice In Wonderland stories. The resulting book and album were released in 1978, and re-released in Australia in 1985.

=== Return to Australia (from 1983 onwards) ===
Harper worked in the UK until 1983, when he decided once again to return to his home in Australia, where he formed the Australian Chamber Jazz Ensemble as a recording and touring group. He also took up the position of Head of Jazz Studies at Wollongong University's School of Creative Arts.

He continued performing live and recording in his later life, and released an album, Images of Australia, in 1997.

Some of his incidental music from Doctor Who was later reused, in reorchestrated form, as part of the De Wolfe stock score of Mary Millington's True Blue Confessions (1980).

In 2005, MF Doom and Danger Mouse, in their collaborative project Danger Doom, sampled Don Harper's "Thoughtful Popper". Elements of "Dank Earth" from the Dawn of the Dead soundtrack were sampled on "Intro" by Gorillaz from Demon Days, which was also produced by Danger Mouse.
