= UNIT =

Fictional military intelligence organization in the Doctor Who franchise

United Nations Intelligence Taskforce / Unified Intelligence Taskforce
- Whoniverse organization
- Logo used since "The Star Beast" (2023)

In-universe information
- Type: Intelligence agency, military organisation
- Location: Worldwide
- Leader: Chief; Brigadier Lethbridge-Stewart; Kate Lethbridge-Stewart
- Key people: Team; John Benton; The Doctor; Liz Shaw; Jo Grant; Mike Yates; Harry Sullivan; Martha Jones; Tegan Jovanka; Ace; Melanie Bush; Donna Noble; Ruby Sunday; Barclay Pierre-Dupont
- Purpose: Defending Earth from extraterrestrial and paranormal threats
- Technologies: Unreliable access to Gallifreyan technology, advanced translation software, the Vlinx
- Powers: Military authority in UN member countries

UNIT is a fictional military organisation from the British science fiction television series Doctor Who and its spin-offs Torchwood, The Sarah Jane Adventures, and The War Between the Land and the Sea. Operating under the auspices of the United Nations and initially led by Brigadier Lethbridge-Stewart, its purpose is to investigate and combat paranormal and extraterrestrial threats to Earth. Several UNIT personnel (such as the Brigadier, Sergeant Benton and Mike Yates) played a major role in the original Doctor Who series, and it was a regular feature from The Invasion (1968) until The Seeds of Doom (1976). The organization returned in the revived series, and has been led by Kate Lethbridge-Stewart since 2012.

Originally referred to as the United Nations Intelligence Taskforce, it was revealed in 2005 that the real-life UN was no longer happy being associated with the fictional organisation and UNIT's full name could now no longer be used (the "UNIT" and "UN" abbreviations could be used as long as it was not explained what the letters stood for). The organisation was renamed to the Unified Intelligence Taskforce in 2008, with the name first being used in the episode "The Sontaran Stratagem." Despite the series now distancing itself from the real-life UN, dialogue in the episode, and several since, indicates that the in-world fictional version of the United Nations still supports UNIT.

== Creation ==
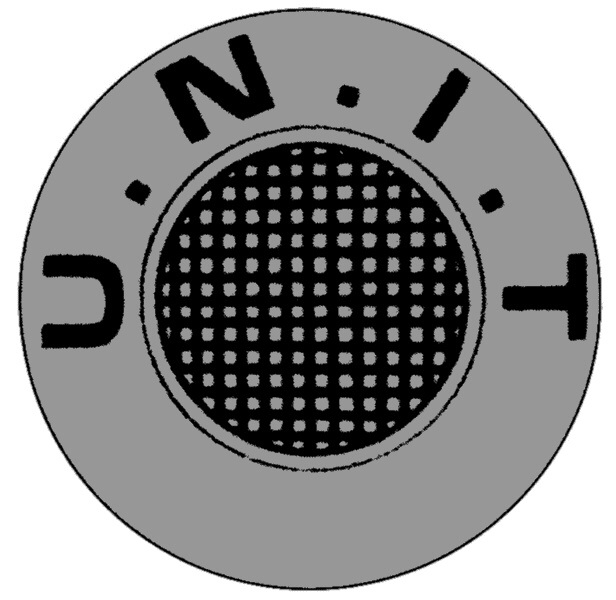
U.N.I.T logo, first seen in the 1968 Doctor Who story The Invasion

In a 2014 interview, former script editor Terrance Dicks recalled that he was present at the "birth" of UNIT during the production of the 1968 Doctor Who serial The Invasion. He credited writer and script editor Derrick Sherwin and producer Peter Bryant as having come up with the idea beforehand, saying that they were testing the concept in The Invasion before it had become central to the show in the Doctor Who serial Spearhead from Space (1970). In a series of interviews originally recorded for the 2006 DVD of the Doctor Who serial Inferno (1970), actor Nicholas Courtney, who played Brigadier Lethbridge-Stewart in The Invasion, similarly described The Invasion as a "dummy run" for the idea of the Doctor, the main protagonist of Doctor Who, being exiled to Earth. Dicks also said that the idea of exiling the Doctor was done because making every serial take place on Earth was cheaper to produce than if every serial had to have a new alien planet built, and that UNIT was an idea Sherwin had come up with to answer the question of what to do with the Doctor after he was exiled to Earth. Speaking in an interview on the 2012 DVD of the Doctor Who serial The Krotons (1968–69), Sherwin said that he wanted Doctor Who to be "down on Earth anyway, for credibility", and described UNIT as "the ideal vehicle" for this.

In another 2014 interview in Doctor Who Magazine, Sherwin recalled that after submitting his scripts for The Invasion to Bryant, which included UNIT, Sherwin, who was also working freelance as a script editor, was told by Bryant to introduce his UNIT idea earlier, as it could "take some of the weight off [the] shoulders" of actor Patrick Troughton, who played the Doctor. Speaking in an interview on the 2011 special-edition DVD of Spearhead from Space, Sherwin said that he had created UNIT because he wanted to give some "considerable support" to the Doctor, "so that [Troughton] didn't have so many damn lines to learn each week."

Sherwin said in 2014 that while working as script editor on the Doctor Who serial The Web of Fear (1968), which included several British Army characters, he told scriptwriters Mervyn Haisman and Henry Lincoln to include all of the characters that he had originally invented for The Invasion. Sherwin was uncertain if the military characters featured in The Web of Fear were part of UNIT, but was "convinced" that, as a teaser for UNIT's more substantial role in The Invasion, The Web of Fear was supposed to have replaced the military characters that were seen in the story. Sherwin asserted that he held the copyright on Lethbridge-Stewart, as he "created him in The Invasion". In an interview recorded for the 2006 DVD release of Inferno, Sherwin described The Invasion as the start of UNIT and the beginning of the Doctor "coming down to Earth". Production notes in Doctor Who: The Complete History credit Haisman and Lincoln as the owners of Lethbridge-Stewart, who was the army commander from The Web of Fear, and mention how Bryant and director Douglas Camfield were negotiating the use of the character for The Invasion from Haisman and Lincoln in May 1968, subsequent to The Web of Fear being broadcast in February and March. The Web of Fear is also described in the notes as being a "major influence on The Invasion".

== Fictional history ==
UNIT insignia first used in Battlefield (1989)

UNIT variation insignia first used in Battlefield (1989)

The roots of UNIT in the Doctor Who universe lie in the Second Doctor serial The Web of Fear (1968), following which the organisation is named and established in The Invasion (1968). According to "Survivors of the Flux" (2021), UNIT was founded in 1958 and built over the subsequent decade, with Lethbridge-Stewart joining the taskforce after it failed to act on the events of the First Doctor story The War Machines (1966).

Following The Invasion, the contribution of scientific advice in battling extraterrestrial threats is recognised and both Dr Elizabeth Shaw and the exiled Third Doctor joins UNIT just in time to help defeat the Autons in Spearhead from Space (1970).

UNIT continued to feature in Doctor Who after Spearhead, but when the Third Doctor's exile is lifted in The Three Doctors (1972–73), his association with UNIT becomes more sporadic, especially after his regeneration into his fourth incarnation at the end of Planet of the Spiders (1974). Although the last appearance of UNIT in the series for many years was in The Seeds of Doom (1976), the organisation continued to execute its mandate to investigate and combat alien activity. The final appearance of UNIT during the original run of Doctor Who was the Seventh Doctor serial Battlefield (1989).

UNIT is mentioned by both its acronym and full name in the 2005 series episodes "Aliens of London" and "World War Three", where it sent a delegation to a gathering of experts at 10 Downing Street. UNIT appeared again the same year in "The Christmas Invasion". In addition to Doctor Who, UNIT has also featured in the spin-off series Torchwood and The Sarah Jane Adventures.

From "The Power of Three" (2012), the first on screen appearance of UNIT in any Whoniverse media since the two-part Doctor Who special "The End of Time" in 2009–2010, UNIT has been shown to have been reorganised by Kate Stewart, the Brigadier's daughter.

In the 2019 New Year special "Resolution", the Thirteenth Doctor attempts to call on Kate Stewart for assistance, but discovers UNIT operations have been suspended and replaced with an outsourced call centre, due to a diplomatic argument over funding.

In the 2020 New Year's Day episode, "Spyfall, Part 1", it is stated that UNIT and Torchwood no longer exist. The 2021 episode "Survivors of the Flux" reveals it to be caused by Grand Serpent, a political figure who assumed the identity of Prentis and was instrumental in UNIT's formation, to facilitate the Sontarans’ invasion of Earth during the Flux crisis. UNIT is resurrected in the 2022 BBC Centenary special "The Power of the Doctor", once again under the leadership of Kate Stewart with a new building in London which is demolished by the end of the episode to defeat the Cybermen.

By the time of the 2023 60th anniversary specials UNIT has relocated to a new headquarters in a skyscraper in the City of London, while remaining under the leadership of Kate Stewart.

In "Lucky Day," (2025), a young conspiracy theorist named Conrad Clark, who was rejected by Kate Stewart, tried to destroy UNIT by falsely exposing them as frauds, something that he is nearly successful in. When he tried to infiltrate UNIT HQ, Kate released an alien creature called the Shreek upon Conrad and refusing to help him until Conrad admitted that he was lying for personal gain all while live-streaming the entire thing to his social media. Although UNIT is saved as a result, Kate's willingness to cross the line and the potential consequences of her actions started affecting her.

During spinoff The War Between the Land and the Sea, UNIT employee Barclay Pierre-Dupont is appointed ambassador of all humanity when the Sea Devils are re-awakened. UNIT themselves are drawn into preventing all-out warfare between humanity and the Sea Devils, as well as thwarting the actions of a conspiracy.

== Organisation ==
UNIT logo no longer in use

UNIT's status is supported by enabling legislation that allows it to assume emergency powers when necessary. Although it operates under the authority of the United Nations, its members are seconded from the host country's military and are still bound to obey that chain of command. Within the UK section of UNIT, ranks are taken from the British Army: Lethbridge-Stewart is a brigadier, Yates is a captain, a major appears in The Seeds of Doom (1976) and "The Christmas Invasion" (2005), and a colonel and a captain appear in "The Sontaran Stratagem"/"The Poison Sky" (2008). UNIT personnel are seconded from all three branches of the British Armed Forces, and are still bound by the chain of command. Major Blake reports to the Prime Minister in "The Christmas Invasion". UNIT is able to call on the conventional military branches for support, and in The Seeds of Doom gets the RAF to provide precision air-strikes. Due to the international nature of the organisation, it is sometimes viewed with suspicion by local military and national security agencies, who feel that it might impinge on their sovereignty. UNIT's existence is known to the public, but mainly as a security organisation with scientific expertise; its actual agenda is classified. Although the Brigadier originally states that UNIT do not arrest people, as of the 21st century, UNIT has the authority to detain persons indefinitely without trial, appeal, outside contact or legal representation, as experienced by Toshiko Sato before she was recruited to work for the British government by the Torchwood Institute in a flashback in the Torchwood episode "Fragments" (2008). The organisation was rearranged by Kate Stewart, the daughter of Brigadier Lethbridge-Stewart. In "The Power of Three" (2012), Kate heads UNIT's scientific research department, which now has authority over the military branch.

=== Equipment ===
British members of UNIT have been armed with standard British Army weapons such as the L1A1 Self-Loading Rifle, Sterling submachine gun, and Browning Hi-Power pistol, and they have worn 58 pattern webbing. They are also shown using heavy weaponry such as bazookas, machine guns, mortars and, in Terror of the Zygons (1975), a depth charge launcher. For Battlefield (1989), they have the Steyr AUG assault rifle while the Brigadier still uses a Webley Revolver. In the 2000s, they use Heckler & Koch G36C carbine, the M4 carbine (with different scopes used such as ACOG and holographic weapon sights, as well as equipping CQB receivers for indoor use), SIG P226 pistols, and for heavy duty, use Stinger missile launchers. In "The Power of Three", they are further equipped with PASGT helmets, goggles, and riot armour for their shins.

UNIT's personnel have a wide range of weaponry to call on, some custom-made to combat specific threats. Among these are special ammunition described by the Brigadier in Battlefield as armour-piercing rounds with a solid core and Teflon coating which "could go through a Dalek". Other munitions include explosive rounds for Yetis, other armour-piercing rounds for robots, and gold-tipped rounds for use against the Cybermen (as well as silver bullets as suggested by the Doctor), and rad-steel coated bullets to neutralise Sontaran anti-bullet fields that target copper.

In The Invasion (1968), UNIT has a command centre established in the cargo hold of a Lockheed Hercules military transport aircraft. The Dæmons (1971) features the UNIT Mobile HQ, a large bus-like vehicle that could be driven to the site of an incident. A mobile command centre is also shown in "The Sontaran Stratagem" and "The Poison Sky", where it is depicted as a black articulated lorry with UNIT insignia.

UNIT employs unarmed helicopters for transport. It is also shown using a tank in Robot (1974–75). In "Planet of the Dead" (2009), it uses trucks with SAM launchers.

In "The Christmas Invasion", UNIT is shown to have translation software which can decipher alien languages with great accuracy. The software, or at least the results from the translation, can be loaded on a hand-held device.

In "The Poison Sky", UNIT is shown to be able to command and co-ordinate the world's combined nuclear arsenal for strategic strikes on orbiting alien craft.

In "The Sound of Drums" (2007), the flying aircraft carrier the Valiant is introduced. The Valiant is also shown (in "The Poison Sky") to be equipped with a scaled down version of the Torchwood Institute weapon that destroyed the Sycorax ship in "The Christmas Invasion".

It is mentioned in The Sarah Jane Adventures story Death of the Doctor (2010) that UNIT has a Moonbase.

In "The Power of Three", UNIT is shown to have a scientific research department with a large laboratory in the base beneath the Tower of London. During the story, the laboratory is dedicated to studying cubes that appeared out of nowhere. Kate Stewart, daughter of the Brigadier and head of the scientific research department, has a handheld device that can scan a body (picking up the Eleventh Doctor's twin hearts), and also serves as a communication device. The computers at UNIT HQ can detect anomalies such as artron energy spikes, and can also access CCTV on the streets. There is also mention of them using helicopters and tanks while testing the destructibility of the cubes.

"The Day of the Doctor" (2013) shows that the Tower of London base contains the Black Archive housing various alien technological devices that UNIT has salvaged over the years and kept hidden away. Protected by various alien defences that erase the memories of visitors to ensure that they cannot reveal what is inside the Archive, the Archive is also 'TARDIS-proof', and has been used by UNIT as a means of assessing the Doctor's companions to confirm whether they can be trusted. UNIT is also shown to at least have access to the Under-Gallery, a secret gallery containing works of art dating back to the Elizabethan era that Elizabeth I ordered locked away as they were too dangerous for the public.

=== Uniform ===
Across the eras, UNIT have been identified with different styles of uniform.

For The Invasion, Privates and Corporals wore No.7 dress, while ranks of Sergeant and above wore uniforms based on No.4 dress, but lacking buttons and with the jacket – which appears to be fastened by velcro – tucked into the trousers. All UNIT members wore oval patches with 'U.N.I.T' embroidered on them on their left sleeves and NCOs wore their badges of rank on their right sleeves. Sand/Beige coloured berets, similar to those worn by the Special Air Service with the black UNIT logo on a round white background as a cap badge were worn by all ranks. For UNIT's next appearance, Spearhead from Space (1970), the No.4s became uniform for all ranks, except for two radar operators seen in the opening who wear No.7s; the female officer wearing a tie with a UNIT logo printed on. The No.4 style of uniform stayed throughout Doctor Who and the Silurians (1970).

Christine Rawlins had a new futuristic-looking design produced for The Ambassadors of Death (1970), which features only in this story. All ranks are given khaki-coloured zip-up jackets without lapels, which are worn over tan rolled-neck sweaters. The Brigadier retained his No.4 uniform.

For Inferno (1970), these changed to Denison smock camouflage uniforms. From Terror of the Autons, producer Barry Letts decided to have UNIT wearing 1960 pattern fatigues, as well as appropriate contemporary British Army or RAF uniform, such as service dress and barrack dress. The UNIT patches and tan berets remain standard, although personnel are also seen in British Army peaked caps with regulation cap badges.

In Terror of the Zygons, they wear DPM camouflage jackets and tactical black cap badges. The Android Invasion (1975) sees them wearing barrack dress, which they also wear for their brief appearance in The Seeds of Doom (1976).

UNIT then had a lengthy absence from the screen. They made a small cameo appearance in "The Five Doctors" (1983), which sees Colonel Crichton wearing service dress and a Sergeant in barrack dress, both with the oval patches on their uniform. Captain Yates returns in the serial also wearing service dress but with no markings.

For their full return in Battlefield, their look was completely updated. Their appearance in this serial is close to the real-world United Nations Peacekeeping troop outfits. UNIT are represented by a nuclear missile convoy wearing UN issued blue berets and DPM camouflage. They have a new UNIT insignia patch of a winged globe, which is worn the upper sleeves and beret. There is also a Czech engineer team wearing Czech camouflage with the same UN issued blue beret as the convoy. The Brigadier returns, wearing at different times service dress, barrack dress, and DPM while wearing a cap rather than beret.

After the series was cancelled and recommissioned, UNIT first had a minor appearance in the episode "Aliens of London" (2005). In this episode, UNIT were represented by four high-ranking US military officers, wearing Army Service Uniform with real UN peacekeeper patches on the sleeves, and Navy Service Uniform. Only the female officers wore headwear, the Army officer a garrison cap, the Navy officer a white female variation combination cap.

UNIT's first major appearance in the new series was in "The Christmas Invasion" in 2005. Here, a new insignia has been designed based on the Battlefield version. The troopers wear black uniforms consisting of police clothing/SAS Counter Revolutionary Warfare (CRW) Wing overalls and a red Royal Military Police beret, and equipment. Insignia is a small silver-metal UNIT parawings on a red beret and a large UNIT Parawing patch worn over the left breast pocket on the utility vest or fatigues. Commanding officers wear No. 2 service dress with UNIT insignia. Variations include Captain Magambo from "Turn Left" (2008) wearing a black version of service dress with a red beret, and Colonel Karim in The Sarah Jane Adventures story Death of the Doctor wearing black civilian clothes with UNIT insignia and rank epaulettes.

UNIT returns in the series 7 episode "The Power of Three". Their uniforms in this series are an alteration of the uniforms seen since 2005. They no longer wear ID cards on the right breast pocket, and appear to lack the logos on the arms. They wear PASGT helmets with black covering and black goggles in place of berets. They also wear riot armour for their forearms and shins, and plain black brassards on the left arm. The scientific research department that now serves as the head of UNIT consists of plainclothes civilians.

The series 8 episode "Death in Heaven" introduces an officer uniform, consisting of black or navy-blue jacket and trousers, white shirt and black tie, with medal ribbons and rank epaulettes, inspired by (but not identical to) officers' No. 2 service dress, sans the gloves, peaked cap and Sam Browne shoulder belt.

After being brought back in The Power of the Doctor, the UNIT combat uniform is solid black, augmented with black or dark blue armoured vests, bearing the UNIT logo on the back. They wear a black helmet with inscribed UNIT logo, or a black beret with a white badge, depending on where they are based. The non-combat staff dress in dark colours.

=== Prominent members of UNIT ===
U.N.I.T logo used in The Day of the Doctor (2013)

The Doctor, the main protagonist of Doctor Who, is a member of UNIT. In "Aliens of London", after reading up about the Doctor during his twelve-month absence, Mickey Smith tells Rose Tyler that the Ninth Doctor knows UNIT because "he's worked for them". In "The Sontaran Stratagem", Colonel Mace tells the Tenth Doctor, "Technically speaking, you're still on staff." In "The Day of the Doctor", the Eleventh Doctor tells Clara Oswald that he works for UNIT and that UNIT is his "job". In "Death in Heaven" (2014), Kate Stewart describes the Twelfth Doctor as "technically" still "on the payroll", as he never resigned.

Prominent members of the British contingent of UNIT include Dr. Elizabeth Shaw, Brigadier Alistair Gordon Lethbridge-Stewart, Sergeant Benton, Captain Yates, UNIT operative Jo Grant and later, Surgeon-Lieutenant Harry Sullivan, RN. After leaving the Doctor, Martha Jones joins UNIT. In The Claws of Axos (1971), an American agent named Bill Filer was sent from Washington to assist in the hunt for The Master. Kate Stewart, the Brigadier's daughter, becomes Head of Scientific Research and Chief Scientific Officer, and then Commander in Chief of UNIT, and appears in multiple episodes beginning with "The Power of Three" in 2012.

=== Republican Security Forces ===
RSF logo used in Inferno

The 1970 serial Inferno sees the Third Doctor visit a parallel universe. In this reality, Britain is a fascist republic, with the British royal family having been executed for treason in 1943, as depicted in the novel I, Alastair; the novel also shows that the leader of Britain in this universe was an associate of British Union of Fascists (BUF) leader Oswald Mosley, and eventually became leader of the country following the downfall of the old order, with his picture being visible in the Brigade Leader's office in Inferno. The parallel version of UNIT is an SS-like state paramilitary organisation known as the Republican Security Forces (RSF), manning their version of the drilling project as a "scientific labour camp".

They are armed with a mixture of Soviet and German weapons, such as the SKS rifle and the Walther P38 pistol. Their rank system uses titles based loosely on that of the BUF: Sergeant Benton is Platoon Under Leader Benton, Brigadier Lethbridge-Stewart is Brigade Leader Lethbridge-Stewart, and Elizabeth Shaw, a soldier rather than a scientist in their dimension, has the rank of Section Leader (which appears to be an officer rank). Their uniforms consist of contemporary US Army olive green military fatigues for Other Ranks, tan uniforms with black rank slides on the shoulders (based on the brown shirts) for officers, and black garrison caps with white piping and an RSF cap-badge as head-dress for both. The organisation has full authority to interrogate, court-martial, and formally execute prisoners as they see fit under the "Defence of the Republic Act, 1943".

By the end of the story, most of the members of the RSF are killed when a volcanic cataclysm engulfed the world and left much of it devastated.

== Main characters ==
- The Doctor has been UNIT's principal scientific advisor since their third incarnation was exiled to Earth (having previously collaborated with UNIT during their second incarnation). The Doctor departed from UNIT's full-time employment during their fourth incarnation, leaving a space-time telegraph (and, later, the TARDIS's telephone number) with which they could be summoned in emergencies. They retain their credentials, still bearing their third incarnation's portrait; and, initially, UNIT personnel Surgeon-Lieutenant Harry Sullivan and Sarah Jane Smith as their companions. Despite the looseness of their UNIT affiliation and their frequent disagreements with the organization, The Doctor continues to consider UNIT's scientific advisor to be their job, even into their thirteenth, fourteenth and fifteenth incarnations. In several instances, the Doctor is often valued as being the ultimate authority, often being made President of Earth.
- Brigadier Alistair Gordon Lethbridge-Stewart (later Sir Alistair Gordon Lethbridge-Stewart) is a founder of UNIT and the original commander of its British contingent. During the Third Doctor's exile on Earth, he hires the Doctor as his scientific advisor. He was the father of Kate Lethbridge-Stewart, another UNIT commander.
- Sergeant Benton first appears as Corporal Benton in The Invasion and becomes a regular fixture of UNIT stories from The Ambassadors of Death until The Android Invasion. In his final three appearances, during the Fourth Doctor era, he has been promoted to regimental sergeant major.
- Liz Shaw, originally drafted from the University of Cambridge as UNIT's scientific advisor, first appears in Spearhead from Space and accepts the position of the Third Doctor's assistant when he takes the job of scientific advisor.
- Jo Grant is a civilian employee of UNIT who was assigned as assistant to the Third Doctor, replacing Liz Shaw. The character appears from the serial Terror of the Autons in 1971 until The Green Death in 1973. According to the novelisation of Terror of the Autons, she holds the rank of Corporal.
- Captain Mike Yates also makes his first appearance in Terror of the Autons and appears regularly throughout the Third Doctor era. He is an officer who mainly serves as Brigadier Lethbridge-Stewart's adjutant.
- Sarah Jane Smith is an investigative journalist who becomes a UNIT associate by way of her companion relationship with the Third, Fourth, Tenth and Eleventh Doctors. Sarah Jane maintains contact with, and receives support from, senior UNIT personnel throughout her lifetime.
- Harry Sullivan, a Surgeon-Lieutenant in the Royal Navy, is a medical officer in UNIT at the time of the Doctor's third regeneration and becomes his companion for several adventures.
- Petronella Osgood, played by Ingrid Oliver, is a UNIT scientist and assistant to Kate Stewart in "The Day of the Doctor" (2013). She wears a long, knitted scarf of many colours, reminiscent of the Fourth Doctor's scarf, and suffers from a respiratory ailment for which she uses an inhaler when over-excited. In "The Day of the Doctor", she comes to be impersonated by a Zygon, and the two get along rather well. Following a peace treaty between humans and Zygons, which resulted in 20 million Zygons settling on earth disguised as humans, the Zygon duplicate remains in the form of Osgood, with neither version of Osgood revealing to others which is which. One version of Osgood works with Kate Stewart and the Twelfth Doctor, in the episode "Death in Heaven" (2014), wearing a bow tie reminiscent of the Eleventh Doctor and Converse reminiscent of the Tenth Doctor. She is shown to be eager to please the Doctor and admires him. The Doctor hints that he might consider making her a companion, but she is disintegrated by Missy. Osgood displayed a great deal of self-control as she near-calmly tried persuading Missy to spare her with logical explanations. In "The Zygon Invasion" (2015), the surviving Osgood is kidnapped by a splinter group of Zygons led by Bonnie, who seeks war with the humans. After being rescued by the Doctor, she travels with him to UNIT Black Archive in an attempt to keep the peace while refusing to tell him whether she is human or Zygon. In "The Zygon Inversion", the Doctor, after successfully convincing Bonnie to live peacefully with humanity, offers Osgood a trip in the TARDIS. Osgood refuses, revealing Bonnie has become her new duplicate.
- Martha Jones, codename "Greyhound 6", becomes a medical doctor after her adventures with the Doctor, and subsequently a Medical Officer for UNIT. She contacts the Doctor so he could help UNIT in the episode "The Sontaran Stratagem" (2008). She becomes trusted enough in UNIT to be given the Osterhagen Key, part of a mechanism for a program to destroy Earth.
- Kate Lethbridge-Stewart, also known as Kate Stewart, is the Commander in Chief of UNIT; formerly the Chief Scientific Officer and de facto leader of UNIT's UK contingent in the 2010s and 2020s. She first appears in "The Power of Three" (2012), introduced by Chris Chibnall, before returning in the fiftieth anniversary special "The Day of the Doctor" (2013) and subsequently recurring during the Twelfth, Thirteenth, Fourteenth and Fifteenth Doctor's eras. Kate is the daughter of Brigadier Lethbridge-Stewart. The character was created for the unofficial spin-off videos Downtime (1995) and Dæmos Rising (2004), in which she was played by Beverley Cressman. She is depicted as a single mother to Gordon Lethbridge-Stewart, who to date has not been referred to in Doctor Who, although Kate has referred to herself as a divorcee and "mother-of-two" (her second child being a daughter) in the programme.
- Tegan Jovanka is a former airhostess and former companion to the Fourth and Fifth Doctors, she is hired to work as a freelancer for UNIT and employed by Kate Stewart before "The Power of the Doctor". She meets the Thirteenth and assists her by blowing up the Cybermen and the new UNIT base and saw a hologram of an aged Fifth Doctor.
- Ace, who was a former companion to the Seventh, was a 16-year-old when she first met the Doctor. She is hired to work as a freelancer for UNIT and employed by Kate Stewart before "The Power of the Doctor". She meets the Thirteenth and assists her by destroying the Dalek's plan with her baseball bat and using her Nitro-9 with the assistance of Graham O'Brien and saw a hologram of an aged Seventh Doctor.
- Shirley Anne Bingham is the 56th scientific adviser to UNIT who made her first appearance in The Star Beast where she was in charge of investigating the seemingly crashed ship of the Meep. She also assists UNIT and the Fourteenth Doctor in investigating the eponymous Giggle in "The Giggle", as well as being present in "Lucky Day" and "The Reality War". She reappears in The War Between the Land and the Sea, still as scientific adviser.
- Melanie Bush, a computer programmer and former companion to the Sixth and Seventh Doctors, she was hired to work as a computer scientist for UNIT by Kate Stewart sometime after 2022's "The Power of the Doctor". She was present for the Fourteenth and Fifteenth Doctors' battle against the Toymaker at UNIT Tower in 2023. She also fought against Sutekh in "Empire of Death", against Conrad in "Lucky Day" and against Omega in "The Reality War".
- Colonel Christofer Ibrahim is a UNIT field officer who answers directly to Kate Stewart and follows her without question. He makes his debut in The Giggle, bringing the Doctor and Donna to his boss, and is present for the Toymaker's defeat. He later reappears in "The Legend of Ruby Sunday", "Empire of Death", "Lucky Day" and "The Reality War"; these episodes have a subplot where he is heavily implied to be in love with Kate. They are in a relationship during The War Between the Land and the Sea, but he dies protecting Kate from an assassin in the story.
- Donna Noble is recruited by Kate at the end of The Giggle, in an unspecified capacity.
- Rose Noble is shown working for UNIT in "The Legend of Ruby Sunday" / "Empire of Death", in an unspecified capacity. She is later shown leading the UNIT resurgence against Conrad in "The Reality War".
- Morris Gibbons is a thirteen-year-old boy genius and scientific advisor who appears in the series 14 two-part finale "The Legend of Ruby Sunday" / "Empire of Death". He is later mentioned in The War Between the Land and the Sea.
- Susan Triad is a woman who has been stalking the Fifteenth Doctor and Ruby during their travels. After Sutekh brings her to life in "Empire of Death", she is recruited by Kate to her personal staff, in an unspecified capacity. She returns in "The Reality War".
- Ruby Sunday is revealed to have been recruited to UNIT after she and the Doctor parted ways. She is shown on Kate's personal staff alongside Shirley and Ibrahim from "Lucky Day" onwards, though her exact role has never been revealed.
- Barclay Pierre-Dupont is a Grade 10 clerk for UNIT who appeared as the main character in The War Between the Land and the Sea. As a clerk, Barclay was responsible for handling transport such as taxis and finding cheaper lorries. In a strange twist of fate, Dupont was brought on board to a covert mission in Dragonera, replacing Roger Trevithick for whom he had once covered for in 2020. After showing respect to a fallen Sea Devil, Barclay is named as the second human ambassador in peace talks between mankind and Homo Aqua, replacing the dismissed Sir Jonathan Hynes.
- Sergeant Hana Chakri is a UNIT non-commissioned officer appearing in The War Between the Land and the Sea, with responsibility for protecting Barclay.
- Corporal Jane Hart is a UNIT soldier appearing in The War Between the Land and the Sea.
- Steve Chesney is a computer expert appearing in The War Between the Land and the Sea.

=== Other media ===
==== Originating in audio ====
- Colonel Vikram Shindi is a field officer in the UNIT: The New Series audio plays, an old-school, humourless soldier who follows Kate Stewart without question.
- Captain Josh Carter is a company officer in UNIT: The New Series, more of a man of action.
- Lieutenant Sam Bishop is a company officer in UNIT: The New Series, and serves as a troubleshooter.
- Lieutenant Jimmy Tan is a company officer introduced later in UNIT: The New Series.

==== Originating in TV but expanded in other media ====
- Allison Williams is the assistant and scientific advisor to Professor Rachel Jensen when UNIT existed as the Intrusion Countermeasures Group. She originated in Remembrance of the Daleks but was fleshed out in the Countermeasures audio series.

== Other appearances ==
UNIT has also been featured in many Doctor Who spin-offs. Different spin-offs have made varying attempts to be consistent with other stories.

=== Stage play ===
In 1984, a stage comedy titled Recall UNIT: The Great T-Bag Mystery was produced, written by Richard Franklin (Captain Yates) who reprised his character in the play. The cast also included John Levene as Benton, and the play was performed between 20 and 24 August as part of the Edinburgh Fringe Festival. Due to other commitments, Nicholas Courtney was unable to appear as the Brigadier, but pre-recorded a telephone message from Lethbridge-Stewart which was written into the plot.

=== Novels ===
The novelisation of Remembrance of the Daleks (1990) by Ben Aaronovitch mentions that the troops that Gilmore commands were from the "Intrusion Counter-Measures Group". UNIT Exposed, the 1991 Doctor Who Magazine Winter Special, suggests that the ICMG is a forerunner of UNIT.

Both Virgin Publishing's Missing Adventures and BBC Books' Past Doctor Adventures have set stories in the UNIT era and have revealed new information about UNIT's past, present and future. The novel Business Unusual sees the Sixth Doctor assist UNIT in an investigation involving the now-retired Brigadier being held prisoner by the agents of the Nestene Consciousness, while Deep Blue sees the Fifth Doctor interact with the Third Doctor's UNIT colleagues at a time when his past self was away. Bullet Times pits the Seventh Doctor and Sarah Jane Smith against a branch of UNIT known as the 'Cortez Project', who consider any alien activity on Earth to be dangerous even if said aliens have no hostile intent, forcing the Doctor to discreetly work with a Chinese triad to help a crashed alien ship repair itself and depart.

No Future (1994) by Paul Cornell featured an intelligence section of UNIT in an alternate 1970s called Broadsword. Broadsword agents wore plain clothes and were "hand-picked to offer us lateral and non-military solutions, backed up by SAS training and sheer common sense".

The 1996 New Adventures novel Just War by Lance Parkin mentions "LONGBOW", a world security organisation set up by the League of Nations that encountered the occasional extraterrestrial incident but was disbanded after it and the League failed to prevent World War II.

The standalone 1996 Virgin novel Who Killed Kennedy by David Bishop, which provides a fictional history of UNIT from an investigative journalist's perspective, reveals Lethbridge-Stewart's role in proposing the formation of UNIT after the Yeti incident.

By the 26th century, UNIT has transformed into a secret society called the Unitatus, pledged to defend the Earth against alien threats, first seen in Parkin's Cold Fusion (1996).

The Dying Days (1997), also by Parkin, names the French division of UNIT as NUIT (Nations Unies Intelligence Taskforce).

The Unitatus lasts at least until the 30th century, according to So Vile a Sin (1997) by Ben Aaronovitch and Kate Orman.

The Devil Goblins from Neptune (1997) by Keith Topping and Martin Day introduced a division within the Central Intelligence Agency headed by a man known only as Control, which has featured as a rival to UNIT in subsequent novels The King of Terror and Escape Velocity, King seeing the Fifth Doctor working with the Brigadier on an investigation in 1999 that forces them to work with the CIA and Control, and Escape depicting Control trying to deal with a new alien presence on Earth before UNIT discover it, only for the threat to be thwarted by the amnesic Eighth Doctor. Alien Bodies (1997) by Lawrence Miles introduced a more ruthless UN division called UNISYC (United Nations Intelligence Security Yard Corps), which by the 2040s has replaced UNIT.

The Face of the Enemy (1998) by David A. McIntee has the British branch of UNIT facing a menace without the Third Doctor to help them, as he and Jo Grant are elsewhere (and elsewhen) experiencing the television serial The Curse of Peladon.

The Southeast Asian contingent of UNIT is identified in McIntee's Bullet Time (2001) as UNIT-SEA.

The 2003 Eighth Doctor Adventure Emotional Chemistry by Simon A. Forward names the Russian division of UNIT ОГРОН (OGRON) (Оперативная Группа Разведки Объединённых Наций, or, Operativnaya Gruppa Razvedki Obyedinyonnih Natsiy, which roughly translates as "United Nations Reconnaissance Operations Group").

=== Comic strips ===
One story in the Doctor Who Magazine comic strip, Final Genesis (DWM #203–206), is set in a parallel universe in which humanity has made peace with the Silurians, and UNIT has become the United Races Intelligence Command.

The Eighth Doctor comic strip The Flood (DWM #346–353) establishes that MI6 views UNIT with some degree of contempt in the early 21st century, and deliberately does not inform them when it detects a Cyberman incursion due to this and other unspecified problems with the United Kingdom's relationship with the United Nations.

The Tenth Doctor comic strip The Age of Ice (DWM #408–411) is set in UNIT's Australian base beneath Sydney Harbour. The Eleventh Doctor strip The Golden Ones (DWM #425–428) introduces UNIT Japan.

UNIT has also appeared in cameo roles in unrelated comics. In issue No. 218 of Uncanny X-Men, a character identified as Brigadier Lethbridge-Stewart is seen briefly from behind, addressing a Sergeant-Major Benton who is loading an unconscious Juggernaut into a lorry; 2000 AD's Caballistics, Inc. strip has Lethbridge-Stewart (referred to solely by rank) appearing in several adventures as a military liaison and referring to The Web of Fear; and Hip Flask has a 22nd-century UNIT tied into the origins of the Elephantmen. Marvel Comics also has two major characters called Dr Alistaire Stuart (who has claimed to know "a chap from Gallifrey") and Brigadier Alysande Stuart, Scientific Advisor and commander, respectively, of Britain's Weird Happenings Organisation (W.H.O.) taskforce.

The Titan Comics Ninth Doctor series includes a storyline where the Ninth Doctor, Rose Tyler and Captain Jack Harkness work with UNIT in the mid-1970s when rival anti-alien organization 'Avalon Defence' try to undermine UNIT's reputation so that they can take over in exchange for financial benefits. The storyline concludes with UNIT nurse Tara Misha joining the TARDIS crew after she sacrifices her own reputation to expose Avalon's deceptions.

=== Audio plays ===
An alternate universe version of UNIT and the Brigadier appear in the Doctor Who Unbound audio play Sympathy for the Devil (2003), produced by Big Finish Productions. In this story, UNIT is commanded by the abrasive Colonel Brimmicombe-Wood. The story concerns a UNIT that never had the Third Doctor working for it, with many different outcomes; Terror of the Autons resulted in "the Plastic Purges", Mike Yates died on a time-travel mission to destroy the Silurians, and so on.

In December 2004, Big Finish released UNIT: Time Heals, the first audio drama in a UNIT spin-off series, which features a retired General Sir Alistair Lethbridge-Stewart as an advisor to a new generation of officers. A preview episode (given away free with Doctor Who Magazine No. 351, and later available as a free download on the Big Finish website), UNIT: The Coup, has Lethbridge-Stewart finally breaking decades of secrecy by informing a press conference of UNIT's true purpose as humanity's first line of defence against the unknown (although, as it turns out, the general public believe this to be a hoax).

The protagonists for most of this series are Colonel Emily Chaudhry, Lieutenant Will Hoffman and Colonel Robert Dalton. Hoffman and Dalton are killed in the third instalment, UNIT: The Longest Night (2005). The fourth play, UNIT: The Wasting (2005), features this universe's version of Brimmicombe-Wood, and is revealed to have been the commander of ICIS all along, and working to destroy UNIT from within. The short story "The Terror of the Darkness" in the collection Short Trips: A Day in the Life (2005) reveals that Chaudhry and Hoffman had previously travelled with the Sixth Doctor. Their adventures then continue in "Incongruous Details" in Short Trips: The Centenarian (2006) before ending in Short Trips: Defining Patterns (2008).

Following the death of Lethbridge-Stewart's actor Nicholas Courtney in 2011, in 2015, Big Finish announced a new series of UNIT audio dramas to be released in six-month intervals beginning with UNIT: Extinction in November. The series features Lethbridge-Stewart's daughter Kate Stewart in her role as Head of Scientific Research, as established in "The Power of Three" (2012), and is the first time that Big Finish have been licensed elements from the 2005 revival series from BBC Worldwide.

=== Direct-to-video productions ===
In 1987, John Levene reprised his role as Benton for a made-for-video film entitled Wartime. Produced by Reeltime Pictures, this was the first independently made Doctor Who spin-off film. In 1997, the film was revised with voice-over dialogue provided by Nicholas Courtney in character as Lethbridge-Stewart. The Brigadier himself got a made-for-video film, Downtime, which also sees appearances from UNIT and a corrupt UNIT officer named Captain Cavendish.

BBV have made a trilogy of UNIT videos involving the Autons, although they feature none of the original members, with the main character being Lockwood (a codename for the otherwise nameless UNIT Operative 8954B)—an investigator with psychic powers. The trilogy introduced one of UNIT's facilities (the Warehouse) for containing the remains of alien technology; the Containment Team responsible for these facilities and preventing alien outbreaks at them; and the Internal Security Division.

=== Other media ===
In the internet Flash animation Scream of the Shalka, Major Kennet hands the Doctor a folder with a UNIT crest on it.

For the new television series, BBC created a faux website for UNIT, complete with "easter eggs" that can be accessed by the reader with the passwords "bison" and "buffalo" (the latter mentioned on screen in "World War Three"). The 'public' part of the website advertises UNIT Conferences and publications relating to "extra-territorial threats", as well as press releases on the establishment of a central New York Liaison office; the press releases and publications also make reference to off-screen adventures, such as the Skaniska Incident and Jersey Tollgate Situation, with the most recent covering the events of "The Christmas Invasion" (2005) ("Alien Life Confirmed"). The Secure Login link, using the password "badwolf" (originally "bison") uncovers a 'private' section which provides UNIT point-of-view reports about various events in the 2005 series, as well as mention of missions such as The Fourth Reich and Guatemala "Big Locust" Problem. Due to the objections by the United Nations as noted above, the letters "UN" are no longer expanded to "United Nations" on the website.

== UNIT dating ==
The original 1963–1989 series presents conflicting evidence about when the stories featuring UNIT are meant to take place, and there has been much confusion and continuing fan debate on this subject. Initially the production team intended for the UNIT stories to take place in the 1980s. In the 1975 story Pyramids of Mars, Sarah Jane Smith explicitly states that she is "from 1980", but the 1983 story Mawdryn Undead explicitly states that the Brigadier retired from UNIT in 1976 and that Warrant Officer Benton left the army in 1979.

A reference to this confusion appeared in the 2008 episode "The Sontaran Stratagem", where the Doctor was unsure if his time on the UNIT staff took place during the 1970s or the 1980s. Similarly, The Sarah Jane Adventures story The Lost Boy displays a UNIT file on Sarah Jane Smith which says, "The service quickly expanded, making our presence felt in a golden period that spanned the sixties, the seventies, and, some would say, the eighties." Yet another reference occurred in "The Day of the Doctor", where Kate Stewart refers to "one of my father's incident files. Codename: Cromer. Seventies or eighties depending on the dating protocol". The Cromer wording is a reference to the 1972–73-story The Three Doctors which, as well as being the first time that Doctors from different eras come together to fight a common foe was the occasion where Brigadier Lethbridge-Stewart, on first being transported to an alien world, likened it to the Norfolk coastal town of Cromer. Kate Stewart again refers to the confusion when she describes events from Terror of the Zygons as occurring in the "'70s (or) '80s" ("The Zygon Invasion").

A possible justification for at least some of these dating anomalies can be found in the audio adventure The Legacy of Time: The Split Infinitive, when a temporal anomaly results in the 1960s and 1970s becoming briefly linked when a flawed time travel experiment essentially splits an individual between these eras. When the crisis concludes after the Seventh Doctor brings the two aspects together, he notes that the resulting temporal explosion will cause a range of minor anomalies to anyone in this era who has dealt with time travel, reflecting that this explains how someone who was working in the eighties could have retired in the seventies.

The episode "Survivors of the Flux" makes reference to the conflicting dates during a scene in which Kate Stewart accuses the Grand Serpent of deliberately tampering with evidence, photographs and dates to cover up his infiltration of UNIT.

== Critical reception ==
The concept of UNIT has been generally well received by Doctor Who fans. In Andrew Cartmel's Through Time: An Unauthorised and Unofficial History of Doctor Who, the sharp contrast between the Doctor's eccentric personality and the seriousness and normality of UNIT is described by Cartmel as an "inspired stroke".

The organisation is often seen within the context of other international organisations which featured in science fiction of the post-war era. Among others, these included SMERSH and SPECTRE from the James Bond novels, S.H.I.E.L.D. from Marvel Comics, and U.N.C.L.E. from The Man from U.N.C.L.E.—like UNIT, intended as a fictional United Nations intelligence agency. There was even a one-season wonder telecast by NBC, in 1979, in which Robert Conrad played A Man Called Sloane who worked for a top-secret agency openly called UNIT.
