= The Devil Goblins from Neptune =

1997 novel by Martin Day and Keith Topping

- Author: Martin Day and Keith Topping
- Series: Doctor Who book: Past Doctor Adventures
- Release number: 1
- Subject: Featuring: Third Doctor; Liz Shaw, The Brigadier, UNIT
- Set in: Period between The Scales of Injustice and Terror of the Autons
- Publisher: BBC Books
- Publication date: 2 June 1997
- Pages: 283
- ISBN: 0-563-40564-3
- Followed by: The Murder Game

The Devil Goblins from Neptune is a BBC Books original novel written by Martin Day and Keith Topping (developed from an original idea by Day, Topping and Paul Cornell) and based on the long-running British science fiction television series Doctor Who. It was the first novel published in the Past Doctor Adventures range and features the Third Doctor, UNIT, The Brigadier, and Liz Shaw.

== Synopsis ==
The Brigadier is pursued across the world from seeming traitors within UNIT, his own organization. The Doctor and Liz deal with an alien invasion that started with an extraterrestrial mass exploding in the atmosphere.

== Continuity ==
The events of the novel take place between the television stories Inferno and Terror of the Autons.

The Devil Goblins are mentioned in the Big Finish Doctor Who audio drama Find and Replace.
