= The King of Terror =

2000 novel by Keith Topping

- Author: Keith Topping
- Series: Doctor Who book: Past Doctor Adventures
- Release number: 37
- Subject: Featuring: Fifth Doctor; Tegan, Turlough, The Brigadier, and UNIT
- Set in: Period between The Awakening and Frontios
- Publisher: BBC Books
- Publication date: November 2000
- Pages: 279
- ISBN: 0-563-53802-3
- Preceded by: Independence Day
- Followed by: The Quantum Archangel

The King of Terror is a BBC Books original novel written by Keith Topping and based on the long-running British science fiction television series Doctor Who. It features the Fifth Doctor, Tegan, Turlough, The Brigadier, and UNIT.

The title may be a reference to a purported prophecy by Nostradamus predicting the arrival of a "King of Terror." Some scholars have argued the phrase is a misinterpretation of one French word for another, but nevertheless it remains in popular use.

== Plot ==
Suspecting the American multimedia company Intercom of nefarious activities, the Brigadier asks the Doctor and Tegan to investigate. At their Los Angeles HQ, the pair run into terrorists obsessed with an ancient prophecy and aliens who turn the city into a battle ground.
