= Keith Topping =

British author, journalist & broadcaster (born 1963)

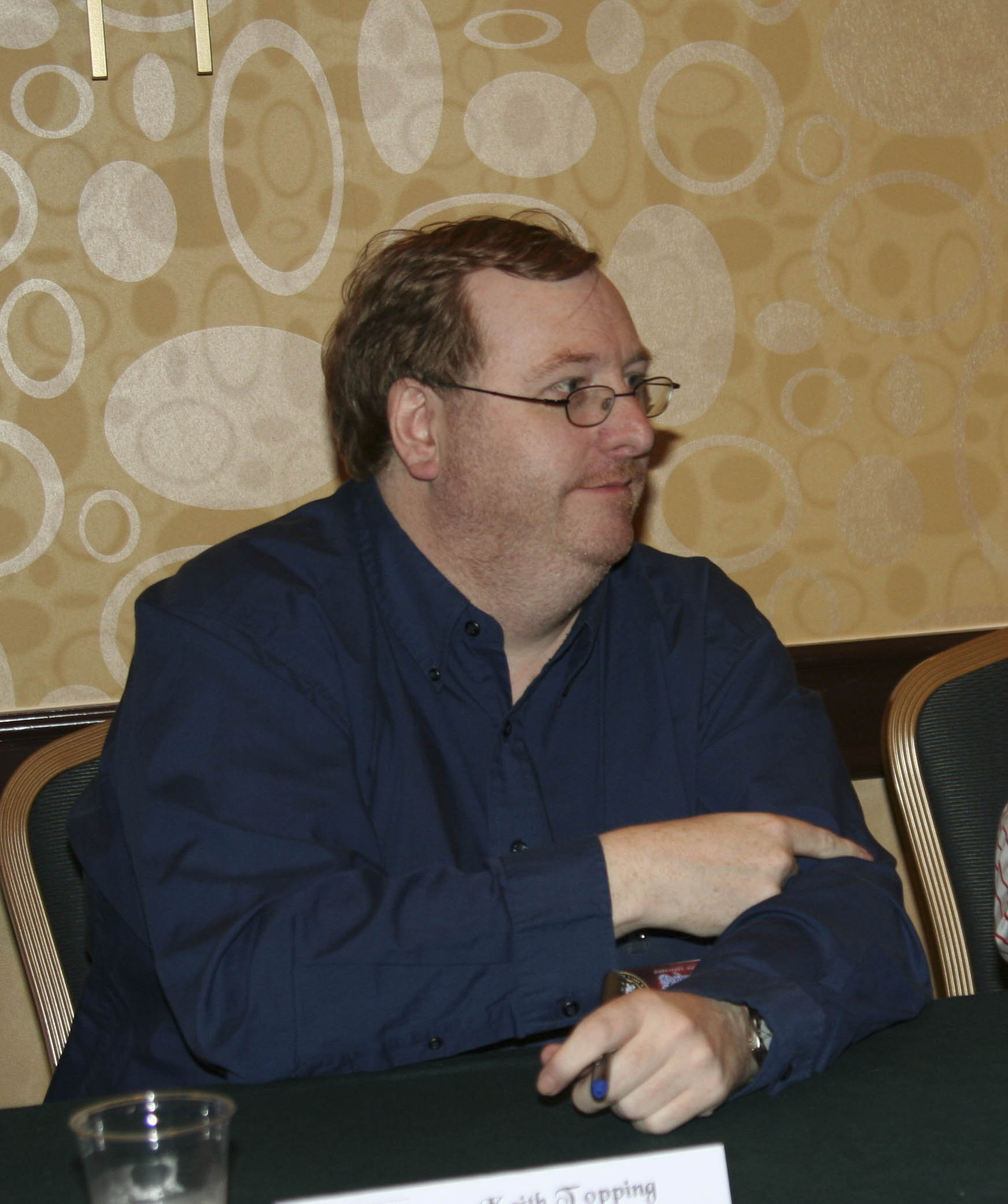
- Keith Topping at a Doctor Who fan convention
- Born: Keith Andrew Topping; 26 October 1963 (age 63); Walker, Newcastle upon Tyne
- Occupations: Author, journalist and broadcaster

Keith Andrew Topping (born 26 October 1963 in Walker, Tyneside) is an author, journalist and broadcaster. He is best known for his work relating to the BBC Television series Doctor Who and for writing numerous official and unofficial guide books to a wide variety of television and film series, particularly Buffy the Vampire Slayer.

He is also the author of two books of rock music critique. To date, Topping has published more than 40 books.

== Early life and background ==
Keith Topping's parents were Thomas Topping (1918–1991) and Lily Lamb (b. 1920) and he has two much older brothers, Terrence John (b. 1944) and Thomas Colin (b. 1948). Topping's family have Irish, Scottish, East Anglian (Snape, Suffolk, Great Yarmouth) and Cumbrian (Crosby-on-Eden) roots as well as North Eastern. He is a distant relative of the Morpeth landscape artist Thomas Bowman Garvie (1859–1944). Topping's great-great-uncle was the Tyneside journalist and columnist Albert Elliott.

He worked for the Civil Service as an Administrative Officer in the, then, Department of Employment between 1983 and 2001 when he left to pursue a full-time freelance writing career.

== Work ==
Topping's first published fiction was the BBC Books "Past Doctor Adventure" The Devil Goblins from Neptune in 1997. The novel was co-written with his friend and frequent collaborator Martin Day.

The pair quickly followed this up with the acclaimed novel The Hollow Men in 1998.

Following Day's move into TV scripting, Topping wrote the novels The King of Terror (2000) and Byzantium! (2001) solo. The latter novel is the only BBC Books Past Doctor Adventure to be set entirely within one episode of the television series Doctor Who — 1965's The Romans by Dennis Spooner.

Topping also wrote the Telos Doctor Who novella Ghost Ship which was published in 2002 and reissued as a paperback in 2003.

As well as writing fiction, Topping has also authored numerous programme guides to television series. These were all published by Virgin Books, and co-written with Martin Day and Paul Cornell.

Cornell, Day and Topping also collaborated on the Doctor Who Discontinuity Guide, published by Virgin Books in 1995 and re-issued, in the US, by MonkeyBrain Books in 2004, a lighthearted guide to the mistakes and incongruities of the television series.

Subsequently, Topping wrote The Complete Slayer: An Unofficial and Unauthorised Guide to Every Episode of Buffy the Vampire Slayer, amongst others.

On radio, Topping was the Producer/Presenter of the monthly Book Club (2005–2007) and co-presented a daily television review slot, Keith Telly Topping's Top TV Tips, Monday to Friday, on The Simon Logan Show for BBC Newcastle (2006–2012).

== Bibliography ==
- The Guinness Book of Classic British TV (1993: Guinness Publishing) cowritten with Paul Cornell and Martin Day ISBN 0-85112-543-3
- The Avengers Programme Guide (1994: Virgin Books) cowritten with Paul Cornell and Martin Day ISBN 0-86369-754-2
- The Doctor Who Discontinuity Guide (1995: Virgin Books) cowritten with Paul Cornell and Martin Day ISBN 0-426-20442-5
- The New Trek Programme Guide (1995: Virgin Books) cowritten with Paul Cornell and Martin Day ISBN 0-86369-922-7
  - (Also published as Der Neue TREK Episoden-Führer (ISBN 3-8025-2400-4) in Germany by VGS Verlagsgescellschaft, Köln (1996))
- The Guinness Book of Classic British TV [Second Edition] (1996: Guinness Publishing) cowritten with Paul Cornell and Martin Day ISBN 0-85112-628-6
- X-Treme Possibilities - A Paranoid Rummage Through The X-Files (1997: Virgin Books) cowritten with Paul Cornell and Martin Day ISBN 0-7535-0019-1
- Doctor Who: The Devil Goblins From Neptune (1997: BBC Books) cowritten with Martin Day ISBN 0-563-40564-3
- The Avengers Dossier (1998: Virgin Books) cowritten with Paul Cornell & Martin Day ISBN 0-86369-754-2
- Doctor Who: The Hollow Men (1998: BBC Books) cowritten with Martin Day ISBN 0-563-40582-1
- X-Treme Possibilities - A Comprehensively Expanded Rummage Through Five Years of The X-Files (1998: Virgin Books) cowritten with Paul Cornell and Martin Day ISBN 0-7535-0228-3
- Shut It! A Fan’s Guide to 70s Cops on the Box (1999: Virgin Books) cowritten with Martin Day ISBN 0-7535-0355-7.
- Slayer: The Totally Cool Unofficial Guide to Buffy (2000: Virgin Books) ISBN 0-7535-0475-8
  - (Also published in France as Tueuse de Vampires: Le guide non officiel de Buffy by Editions Hors Collection, ISBN 2-258-05445-1 (2000))
- Hollywood Vampire: The Unofficial Guide to Angel (Nov 2000: Virgin Books) ISBN 0-7535-0531-2
  - (Also published in France as Le Vampire D’Hollywood: Le guide non officiel de La Serie Angel by Editions Hors Collection, ISBN 2-258-05649-7 (2001))
- Doctor Who: The King of Terror (Nov 2000: BBC Books) ISBN 0-563-53802-3
- Slayer: The Revised and Updated Unofficial Guide to Buffy The Vampire Slayer (Mar 2001: Virgin Books) ISBN 0-7535-0553-3
- Doctor Who: Byzantium! (Jul 2001: BBC Books) ISBN 0-563-53836-8
- High Times: An Unofficial and Unauthorised Guide to Roswell (Oct 2001: Virgin Books) ISBN 978-0-7535-0630-1
  - (Also published in France as Roswell: Le Guide non officiel les 2 premières saisons by Editions Hors Collection, ISBN 2-258-05942-9 (2002))
- Hollywood Vampire: A Revised and Updated Unofficial and Unauthorised Guide to Angel (Dec 2001: Virgin Books) ISBN 0-7535-0601-7
- Slayer: An Expanded and Updated Unofficial and Unauthorised Guide to Buffy the Vampire Slayer (Feb 2002: Virgin Books) ISBN 0-7535-0631-9
- Inside Bartlet’s White House: An Unofficial and Unauthorised Guide to The West Wing (April 2002: Virgin Books) ISBN 0-7535-0612-2.
- Doctor Who: Ghost Ship (August 2002: Telos Publishing), ISBN Standard Hardback 1-903889-08-1. ISBN Deluxe Hardback 1-903889-09-X. ISBN Paperback 1-90-3889-32-4.
- Beyond the Gåte: An Unofficial and Unauthorised Guide to Stargate SG-1 (October 2002: Telos Publishing). ISBN 1-903889-50-2.
- Slayer The Next Generation: An Unofficial and Unauthorised Guide to Season Six of Buffy the Vampire Slayer (January 2003: Virgin Books) ISBN 0-7535-0738-2
- A Day in the Life: The Unofficial & Unauthorised Guide to 24 (April 2003: Telos Publishing) ISBN 1-903889-53-7
- The Complete Clash (September 2003: Reynolds & Hearn Publishing) ISBN 1-903111-70-6
- Hollywood Vampire: A Revised and Updated Unofficial and Unauthorised Guide to Angel (Jan 2004: Virgin Books) ISBN 0-7535-0807-9
- Inside Bartlet’s White House: An Unofficial and Unauthorised Guide to The West Wing – Revised and Updated (April 2004: Virgin Books) ISBN 0-7535-0828-1.
- Slayer: The Last Days of Sunnydale: An Unofficial and Unauthorised Guide to the Final Season of Buffy the Vampire Slayer (June 2004: Virgin Books) ISBN 0-7535-0844-3
- Slayer: A totally awesome collection of Buffy trivia (August 2004: Virgin Books) ISBN 0-7535-0985-7
- The Complete Slayer: An Unofficial; and Unauthorised Guide to Every Episode of Buffy the Vampire Slayer (November 2004: Virgin Books) ISBN 0-7535-0931-8
- A Vault of Horror: A Book of 80 Great (and not-so-great) British Horror Movies 1956-1974 (Telos Publishing: October 2004) ISBN 1-903889-58-8
- The Discontinuity Guide: The Unofficial Doctor Who Companion (MonkeyBrain Publishing: October 2004) co-written with Paul Cornell and Martin Day ISBN 1-932265-09-0
- Hollywood Vampire: The Apocalypse - An Unofficial and Unauthorised Guide to the Final Season of Angel (Virgin Books: January 2005) ISBN 0-7535-1000-6
- Do You Want to Know a Secret?: A Fab Anthology of Beatles Facts (Virgin Books: July 2005) ISBN 0-7535-1041-3
- Hollywood Vampire: A Totally Awesome Collection of Angel Trivia (Virgin Books: August 2005) co-written with Deborah Williams. ISBN 0-7535-1007-3
- Triqueta: The Unauthorised and Unofficial Guide to the Hit TV Series Charmed (Telos Publishing: Feb 2006) ISBN 1-84583-002-4
- The Complete Slayer: The Unofficial and Unauthorised Guide to Seven Seasons of Buffy the Vampire Slayer: The Unofficial and Unauthorised Guide to Buffy the Vampire Slayer (Telos Publishing: Mar 2019) ISBN 1-84583-126-8
- A Vault of Horror: A Book of 80 Great British Horror Movies From 1956 – 1974 (Revised (Telos Publishing: Sep 2020) ISBN 1-84583-158-6
- Return to the Vault of Horror: A Book of 58 Great British Horror Movies From 1956 - 1978 (Telos Publishing: Oct 2024) ISBN 1-84583-240-X
- Island of Terror: A Book of 60 Great British SF and Fantasy Movies From 1936-1984 (Telos Publishing: Nov 2025) ISBN 1-84583-251-5
- Bride of A Vault of Horror: A Book of 72 Great British Films of Mystery and Suspense From 1933-1986 (Telos Publishing: Oct 2026) ISBN 978-1-84583-270-4
