= Revenge of the Cybermen =

079 – Revenge of the Cybermen
- Doctor Who serial

Cast
- Doctor: Tom Baker – Fourth Doctor
- Companions: Elisabeth Sladen – Sarah Jane Smith; Ian Marter – Harry Sullivan
- Others: Ronald Leigh-Hunt – Commander Stevenson; Jeremy Wilkin – Kellman; William Marlowe – Lester; Alec Wallis – Warner; Michael Wisher – Magrik (Note: Also provided the voices of crewmember Colville and a Vogan Radio Operator, uncredited.); Kevin Stoney – Tyrum; David Collings – Vorus; Brian Grellis – Sheprah; Christopher Robbie – Cyber Leader; Melville Jones – Cyberman

Production
- Directed by: Michael E. Briant
- Written by: Gerry Davis; Robert Holmes (uncredited)
- Script editor: Robert Holmes
- Produced by: Philip Hinchcliffe
- Music by: Carey Blyton; Peter Howell (uncredited)
- Production code: 4D
- Series: Season 12
- Running time: 4 episodes, 25 minutes each
- First broadcast: 19 April 1975
- Last broadcast: 10 May 1975

Chronology
← Preceded by Genesis of the Daleks	Followed by → Terror of the Zygons

Revenge of the Cybermen is the fifth and final serial of the 12th season of the British science fiction television series Doctor Who, which was first broadcast in four weekly parts on BBC1 from 19 April to 10 May 1975. Written by Gerry Davis and directed by Michael E. Briant, the serial was the first to feature the Cybermen since The Invasion (1968) and the last until Earthshock (1982).

The serial is set on Space Station Nerva, now called Nerva Beacon, and the "planet of gold" Voga, thousands of years before The Ark in Space. In the serial, the Cybermen plot to destroy Voga, as the gold there is lethal to them.

Following the serial's release, it received mixed to negative reviews. The serial has been rereleased for DVD several times and has received a novelisation written by Terrance Dicks.

== Plot ==
Following on from Genesis of the Daleks, the Fourth Doctor, Harry and Sarah use the Time Ring to return to Space Station Nerva. They arrive aboard the space station thousands of years before the events of The Ark in Space and The Sontaran Experiment. The TARDIS is not aboard Nerva, as it is travelling back in time towards them. The trio discover that the space station is full of dead bodies, apparently the result of a plague.

The time travellers come into contact with the surviving Nerva crew, led by Commander Stevenson. The quarantined space station is now operating as an orbital beacon, warning ships away from a drifting, supposedly uninhabited planetoid named Voga, which is composed almost entirely of gold. Professor Kellman, a civilian planetary surveyor, has been using Nerva as a base for cataloguing Vogan geology, travelling there via a Transmat teleportation system. Secretly, he has entered into an alliance with the Cybermen to wipe out the station's crew using Cybermats, one of which attacks Sarah and poisons her, revealing the actual source of the "plague". The Doctor uses the Transmat to beam Sarah and Harry down and purge the poison from her body, but Kellman's sabotage leaves him unable to beam them back. Meanwhile, Sarah and Harry discover that Voga is in fact populated by a race called the Vogans, with the two being captured by a military leader named Vorus, who reveals that Kellman is in fact a double agent working to destroy the Cybermen once and for all, with Voga's gold reserves having been previously used to create weapons deadly to the Cybermen.

The Cybermen dock with Nerva and easily overpower the Doctor and the two remaining crewmembers, who they force to carry powerful bombs into the core of Voga, which will destroy the planet. Kellman beams down to Voga in an attempt to warn Vorus, but unwittingly identifies himself to some Vogans allied to Vorus' rival and the leader of Voga's government, Tyrum. After being arrested, Kellman reveals the full plan to Tyrum, leading to a truce between him and Vorus, the latter of whom reveals that his plan is to destroy Nerva and all the Cybermen on it with a missile called the Skystriker. With the missile not yet ready for launch, Sarah returns to the beacon, while Harry and Kellman intercept the Doctor and help to disarm the bombs they were outfitted with, but Kellman is killed by a rockslide.

Realising that their plan has failed, the Cyber Leader decides to crash Nerva itself into Voga. The Doctor beams back aboard Nerva and he and Sarah Jane try to turn the Cybermats on their creators, but are themselves captured and restrained. Seeing that Nerva is on a collision course with the planet, Vorus panics and launches the Skystriker, but is shot dead by Tyrum in the process. Stevenson manages to take control of the Skystriker and uses it to destroy the departing Cyberman ship, while the Doctor frees himself and steers Nerva away just in time to avoid disaster. Harry returns to Nerva via transmat and the TARDIS materialises on the station. The Doctor receives a message from Brigadier Lethbridge-Stewart asking him to return to 20th-century Earth due to an emergency. They quickly board the TARDIS and it dematerialises.

== Production ==
=== Writing ===
Gerry Davis wrote the initial script, titling it Return of the Cybermen. Robert Holmes' rewrite added the Vogan elements and changed Return to Revenge. Producer Philip Hinchcliffe was new to the programme; this serial was commissioned by his predecessor Barry Letts. Letts and Holmes felt that with a new Doctor coming in and at that stage little idea of how he would be played, it would be best to play safe by using familiar big-name monsters such as the Daleks and Cybermen in the first season. The script was modified as production developed to incorporate Tom Baker's style, and also had to be rewritten to modify how writer Gerry Davis had envisaged the new Doctor – as a more timid, reserved figure much in the manner of Patrick Troughton, which happened to be rather unlike Baker's portrayal. Davis was also unhappy with the story's title.

=== Location filming ===
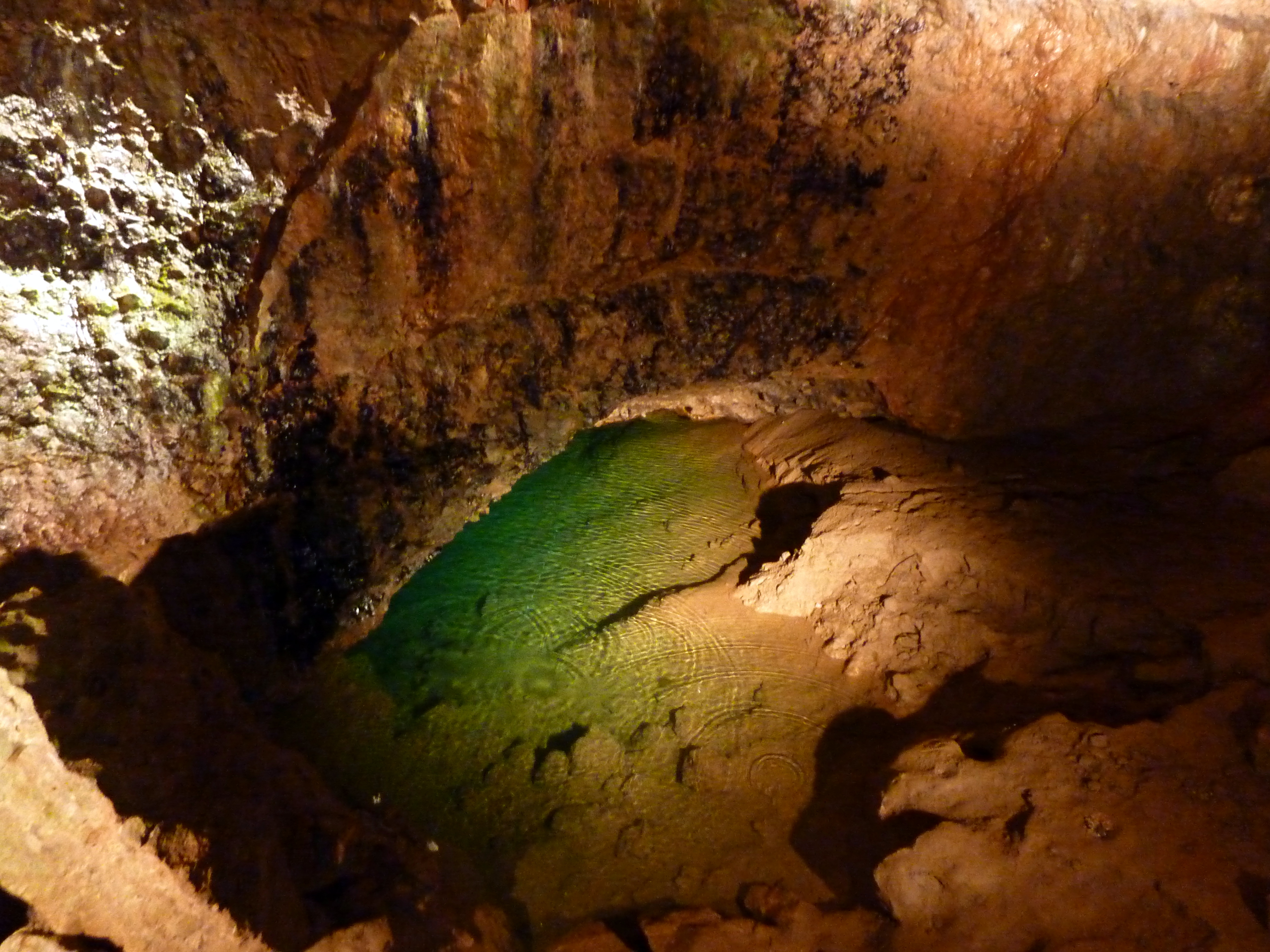
Wookey Hole Caves, used as a filming location for the planet Voga

The story was shot on the same set as The Ark in Space – representing a substantial cost saving – with location filming in Wookey Hole Caves. It was also shot in the production block immediately after Ark, which explains why the production code is out of broadcast sequence. The location filming at Wookey Hole was plagued by a series of problems which the crew blamed on a curse. The curse apparently was brought about when the production staff found a small rock formation that the locals called "The Witch". Despite warnings, they proceeded to put a witch hat and cloak on it. Briant encountered an individual in spelunking gear, which the Wookey Hole staff had no knowledge of, whom Briant was convinced was the spirit of a potholer who had died in the caves, three years earlier. The assistant floor manager suffered a severe attack of claustrophobia, another crew member fell ill, and an electrician suffered a broken leg when a ladder collapsed. During the scene when Sarah Jane rides one of the water skimmers, the boat went wild and Sladen was forced to jump off, treading water despite heavy boots until her rescue by Terry Walsh, the programme's longtime stuntman. Both required precautionary vaccinations at a local hospital but were otherwise unhurt. The boat disappeared and was never seen again.

=== Costumes and props ===
Cyberman helmet design

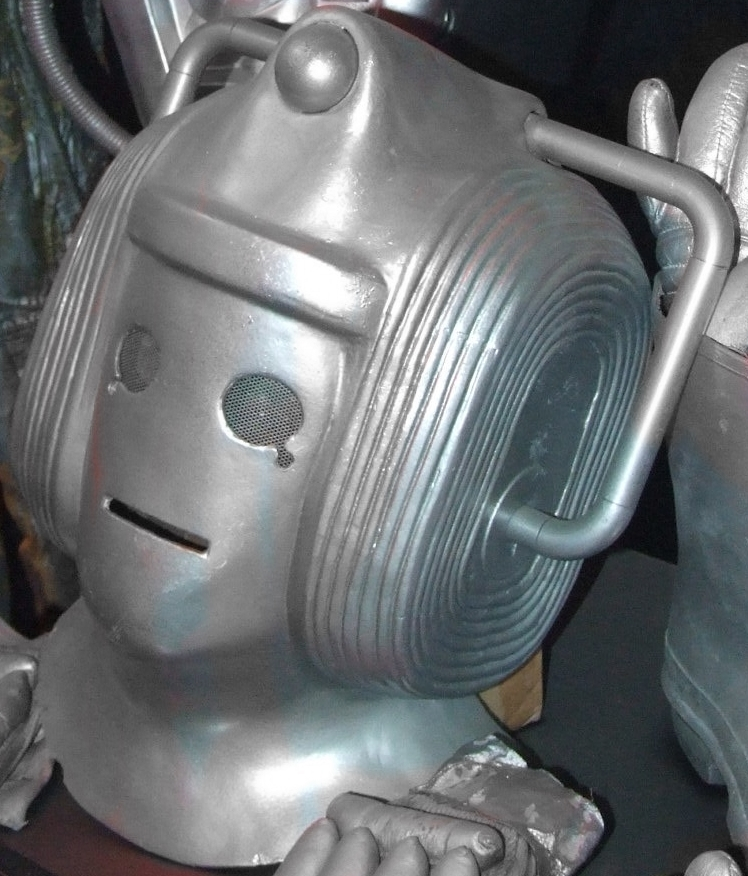
The Invasion Cyberman

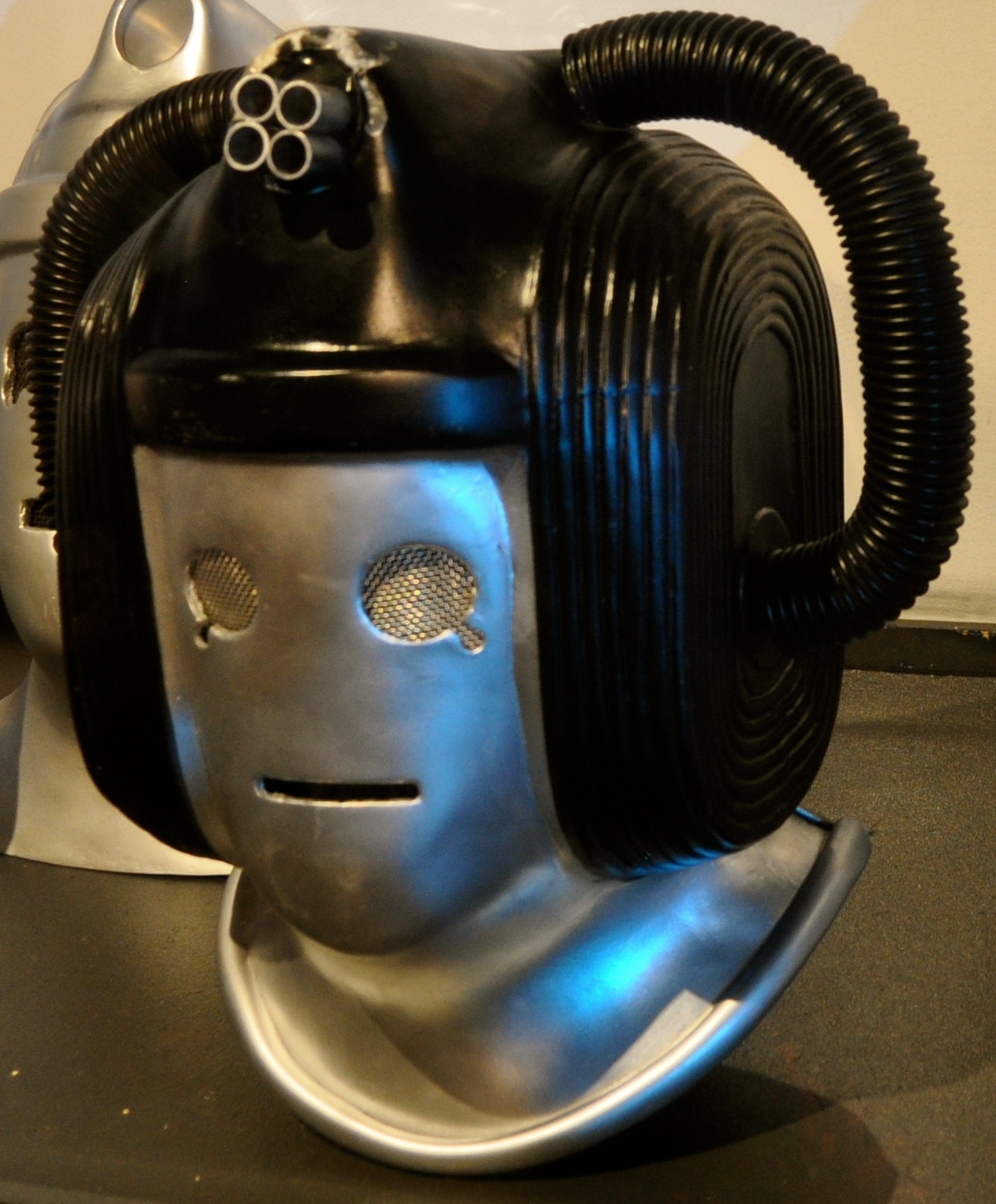
Revenge Cyberleader

Cyberman costumes were derived from the 1968 serial The Invasion

The secret radio transmitter disguised as a clothes brush, used by Kellman, is the same prop that appears in the 1973 James Bond film Live and Let Die. The prop was handed over by Bond star Roger Moore when he visited the BBC in 1973. He later told the Radio Times that the props master, not recognising Moore, had paid him two shillings and sixpence for the item: "I'd popped into the Beeb [BBC] for a cup of tea and spotted a notice about an upcoming "Doctor Who", so I thought the darlings would be so cash-strapped they'd need anything they could get their hands on. It wasn't MGM, after all. But I didn't expect to walk out with two and six!"

The masks for the principal actors playing the Vogans were specially moulded to their faces, but for the non-speaking artists the BBC had to cut costs. According to actor David Collings on the DVD commentary, who played Vorus, the masks for the extras were made using a facial mould of Dad's Army star Arnold Ridley. Originally, Cyber-costumes from the 1968 serial The Invasion were to have been used, but only two had survived, and in poor condition. This necessitated entirely new outfits, which included chest panels constructed from the innards of old television sets and trousers which, for the first time since The Moonbase, were not tucked into the Cyber-boots. Director Michael E. Briant opted to put the characters on the Nerva Beacon into contemporary clothing and have them use modern machine guns rather than attempt to depict the future through fashion.

Another first appearance is a circular symbol containing interlocking spirals which was designed by Roger Murray-Leach for the Vogan costumes and interior sets. Leach later re-used this Vogan symbol for the 1976 serial The Deadly Assassin as a symbol of the Time Lords. It later became known as the Seal of Rassilon, the founder of Time Lord society.

== Cast notes ==
Kevin Stoney appeared in The Daleks' Master Plan and The Invasion (1968). Michael Wisher was in The Ambassadors of Death, Terror of the Autons, Carnival of Monsters, Frontier in Space, Planet of the Daleks, Death to the Daleks, Genesis of the Daleks and Planet of Evil. Ronald Leigh-Hunt previously appeared in The Seeds of Death. William Marlowe appeared in The Mind of Evil. David Collings would later return in Mawdryn Undead and The Robots of Death.

=== Music ===
Carey Blyton composed the incidental music for this serial, his final work for the series. Producer Philip Hinchcliffe asked the BBC Radiophonic Workshop to enhance the score, which was done by Peter Howell by adding some synthesiser cues to Blyton's score. This was Howell's debut on the series but it was uncredited. Howell would go on to arrange the 1980 Doctor Who theme music and provide incidental music for the series from The Leisure Hive (1980) to The Two Doctors (1985).

== Broadcast and reception ==
Episode	Title	Run time	Original release date	UK viewers (millions)
1	"Part One"	24:19	19 April 1975	9.5
2	"Part Two"	24:24	26 April 1975	8.3
3	"Part Three"	24:32	3 May 1975	8.9
4	"Part Four"	23:21	10 May 1975	9.4

Paul Cornell, Martin Day, and Keith Topping gave the serial a negative review in The Discontinuity Guide (1995), describing it as "a contradictory, tedious, and unimaginative mess", and considered the title to be "rubbish" too. In The Television Companion (1998), David J. Howe and Stephen James Walker said that the story was neither good nor bad, but was a "disappointing way to end the season". They praised the new look of the Cybermen, the direction, and some of the supporting characters but said, "a story with a weak script and a poor plot is always going to have a struggle to impress the viewer, and Revenge of the Cybermen is no exception." In 2010, Patrick Mulkern of Radio Times gave Revenge of the Cybermen one star out of five, calling the gold revelation "a ridiculous development" and said that the Cybermen returned with "an overall lapse of scripting, performance, design and direction". Mulkern believed that the location work for Voga allowed the story to "occasionally gleam with life".

SFX reviewer Ian Berriman called the story a "blandly competent, meat-and-potatoes action-adventure fare". On the other hand, Berriman was positive towards the camp appeal of the Cyber Leader, the Doctor being strapped to a bomb, and the "reliably brilliant" main cast. DVD Talk's John Sinnot felt that not all of the story's criticism was warranted, and gave it three and a half out of five stars. Sinnot wrote that the Vogans were interesting and the Cybermen were "menacing" if not at their best. He still noted plot holes, and criticised the cybermats and Harry's "bumbling buffoon" character.

In a 2010 article for Den of Geek, while choosing Philip Hinchcliffe as the greatest producer of Doctor Who, Alex Westthorp cited Revenge of the Cybermen as the least successful story of his tenure.

== Commercial releases ==
=== In print ===
Doctor Who and the Revenge of the Cybermen
- Author: Terrance Dicks
- Cover artist: Chris Achilleos
- Series: Doctor Who book: Target novelisations
- Release number: 51
- Publisher: Target Books
- Publication date: 20 May 1976
- ISBN: 0-426-10997-X

A novelisation of this serial, written by Terrance Dicks, was published by Target Books in May 1976. A Polish translation was published in 1994. In the US, a novelisation was printed by Pinnacle Fiction in January 1989. An audiobook of the Target novelisation was released by BBC Audio on 3rd February 2022 read by Nicholas Briggs.

=== Home media ===
This story was the very first Doctor Who serial to be commercially released on VHS in October 1983. Earlier that year, BBC Enterprises distributed a questionnaire to fans at the Doctor Who exhibition in Longleat, as to which serial should be released as the first Doctor Who video, but the most popular answer, The Tomb of the Cybermen (1967), was at the time missing from their archives. BBC Enterprises reportedly felt that this showed there was interest in releasing an early cyberman story, however, leading to Revenge being selected instead. It was initially released in an edited omnibus format, with the opening and closing titles of each episode removed. This omnibus was also released on Betamax and Laserdisc. It was one of the very few Doctor Who releases on Video 2000. To promote the release, Tom Baker and a cyberman attended the Heathrow Software Show in September 1983. Despite the tape's high price of £39.95, it became the month's best-selling television title on video.

The video was re-released in 1985 so that it could receive a certificate from the British Board of Film Classification (BBFC), becoming the first Doctor Who serial to receive a rating from them. The BBFC gave it the lightest U certificate, as per the BBC's request, feeling that although some of the effects and action sequences were quite strong at the U category, children should be allowed to enjoy "some resolved thrills". It was later released in an unedited, episodic format in May 1999 in the United Kingdom only.

The DVD of this story was released on 9 August 2010 as part of the Cybermen box set, along with the Seventh Doctor serial Silver Nemesis. It would later be released in the US as a standalone story on DVD in early November 2010. This serial was also released as part of the Doctor Who DVD Files in Issue 111 on 3 April 2013.

It was released on Blu-ray with updated special effects in Doctor Who The Collection Season 12.

=== Soundtrack ===
Doctor Who: Revenge of the Cybermen

Soundtrack album by Carey Blyton with Peter Howell and the BBC Radiophonic Workshop
- Released: 24 November 2023
- Genre: Soundtrack
- Length: 51:54
- Label: Silva Screen

Doctor Who soundtrack chronology
Doctor Who: Time and the Rani (2023)	Doctor Who: Revenge of the Cybermen (2023)	Doctor Who: The Daleks in Colour (2024)

BBC Radiophonic Workshop chronology
La Planète Sauvage (with Stealing Sheep) (2021)	Doctor Who: Revenge of the Cybermen (2023)	Inventions for Radio (2023)

Music from this serial by Carey Blyton with additional embellishments by Peter Howell of the BBC Radiophonic Workshop was released on 24 November 2023.

==== Track listing ====
All tracks are written by Carey Blyton, except where noted.

The Complete Original Carey Blyton Score Part One
No.	Title	Writer(s)	Length
1.	"Doctor Who - Opening Title Theme"	Ron Grainer, arr. Delia Derbyshire	0.45
2.	"Return to Nerva Beacon"		2.02
3.	"Can Anyone Hear Me?"		0.36
4.	"Cybermat / Unspool / Plague"		1.53
5.	"Cybership I"		0.23
6.	"Searching Kellman's Room"		1.05
7.	"Sarah vs Cybermat Part 1"		0.31

Part Two
No.	Title	Length
8.	"Sarah vs Cybermat Part 2"	0.18
9.	"Sabotage"	0.42
10.	"It's Happening All Over Again"	0.11
11.	"The Skystriker"	0.26
12.	"On Voga"	0.40
13.	"Sarah and Harry Captured Part 1"	0.47
14.	"Sarah and Harry Captured Part 2"	0.10
15.	"Cybership II"	0.19
16.	"Enter Vorus"	0.08
17.	"Remote Control Threat"	0.33
18.	"Tyrum and Vorus"	0.37
19.	"One More Pull"	0.17
20.	"Caves Chase"	0.50
21.	"Caves Chase Continued"	0.29
22.	"Surrounded"	0.35
23.	"Boarding Party"	0.59

Part Three
No.	Title	Length
24.	"The Beacon is Ours"	0.41
25.	"Tyrum Fanfare"	0.15
26.	"Prisoners"	0.13
27.	"Fresh Orders"	0.19
28.	"It Cannot Be Stopped"	0.21
29.	"Loose Thinking / The Bomb"	1.27
30.	"The Countdown Has Commenced"	1.01
31.	"Cybermarch"	1.27
32.	"Radarscope"	0.23
33.	"Adventures on Voga"	1.19
34.	"Rockfall"	1.15

Part Four
No.	Title	Writer(s)	Length
35.	"Surface Party and Detonation"		1.47
36.	"Nine Minutes"		0.26
37.	"Cybermat vs Cybermen"		0.44
38.	"The Biggest Bang in History?"		0.45
39.	"Waltz - All's Well That Ends Well"		0.17
40.	"Doctor Who - Closing Title Theme (53” Version)"	Ron Grainer, arr. Delia Derbyshire	0.54

Alternative and Synthesiser Cues Parts One and Two
No.	Title	Writer(s)	Length
41.	"Sarah vs Cybermat (end of part 1 alternative)"	Additional sythesiser arrangements by Peter Howell at the BBC Radiophonic Workshop	0.20
42.	"Sarah vs Cybermat (start of part 2)"	Additional sythesiser arrangements by Peter Howell at the BBC Radiophonic Workshop	0.56
43.	"It's Happening All Over Again (random organ)"		0.06
44.	"Sarah and Harry Captured (alternative)"	Additional sythesiser arrangements by Peter Howell at the BBC Radiophonic Workshop	0.46
45.	"Put That Gun Down (synth cue)"	Additional sythesiser arrangements by Peter Howell at the BBC Radiophonic Workshop	0.20
46.	"Cybership II (alternative)"	Additional sythesiser arrangements by Peter Howell at the BBC Radiophonic Workshop	0.24
47.	"Remote Control Threat (alternative)"	Additional sythesiser arrangements by Peter Howell at the BBC Radiophonic Workshop	0.35
48.	"One More Pull (alternative) and Vogan Gunfight"	Additional sythesiser arrangements by Peter Howell at the BBC Radiophonic Workshop	0.58
49.	"Cybership III (synth cue)"	Additional sythesiser arrangements by Peter Howell at the BBC Radiophonic Workshop	0.17
50.	"Caves Chase (alternative)"	Additional sythesiser arrangements by Peter Howell at the BBC Radiophonic Workshop	1.20
51.	"Cybership IV (synth cue)"	Additional sythesiser arrangements by Peter Howell at the BBC Radiophonic Workshop	0.23
52.	"Caves Chase Continued (alternative)"	Additional sythesiser arrangements by Peter Howell at the BBC Radiophonic Workshop	0.36
53.	"Surrounded (alternative)"	Additional sythesiser arrangements by Peter Howell at the BBC Radiophonic Workshop	0.38
54.	"Boarding Party (end of Part 2 alternative)"	Additional sythesiser arrangements by Peter Howell at the BBC Radiophonic Workshop	0.25

Part Three
No.	Title	Writer(s)	Length
55.	"Jelly Babies (synth cue)"	Additional sythesiser arrangements by Peter Howell at the BBC Radiophonic Workshop	0.10
56.	"Tyrum Fanfare (edited cue as used)"		0.10
57.	"It Cannot Be Stopped (alternative)"	Additional sythesiser arrangements by Peter Howell at the BBC Radiophonic Workshop	0.37
58.	"Loose Thinking (alternative)"	Additional sythesiser arrangements by Peter Howell at the BBC Radiophonic Workshop	0.31
59.	"The Bomb (alternative)"	Additional sythesiser arrangements by Peter Howell at the BBC Radiophonic Workshop	0.19
60.	"The Countdown Has Commenced (alternative)"		0.06
61.	"Looped Cybermarch"		0.29
62.	"Looped Cybermarch with Synth"	Additional sythesiser arrangements by Peter Howell at the BBC Radiophonic Workshop	0.47
63.	"Adventures on Voga (synth cues)"	Additional sythesiser arrangements by Peter Howell at the BBC Radiophonic Workshop	1.07
64.	"The Red Zone (Random Organ)"		0.06
65.	"Heartbeat Countdown I (synth cue)"	Additional sythesiser arrangements by Peter Howell at the BBC Radiophonic Workshop	1.25
66.	"Heartbeat Countdown II (synth cue)"	Additional sythesiser arrangements by Peter Howell at the BBC Radiophonic Workshop	1.09
67.	"Rockfall (alternative)"	Additional sythesiser arrangements by Peter Howell at the BBC Radiophonic Workshop	1.17

Bonus Tracks
No.	Title	Length
68.	"Session Tapes - Random Organ, Specimen Gong, Timps"	3.08
69.	"Session Tapes - m42a & 42b (improvs)"	1.58
Total length:		51.54

== Bibliography ==
- Cornell, Paul; Day, Martin; Topping, Keith (1995). "Revenge of the Cybermen" (reprinted on BBC Doctor Who website). The Discontinuity Guide. London: Virgin Books. pp. 176–178. ISBN 0-426-20442-5.
- Haining, Peter. Doctor Who: 25 Glorious Years W H Allen (1988) ISBN 1-85227-021-7
