= Doctor Who exhibitions =

Displays of television memorabilia

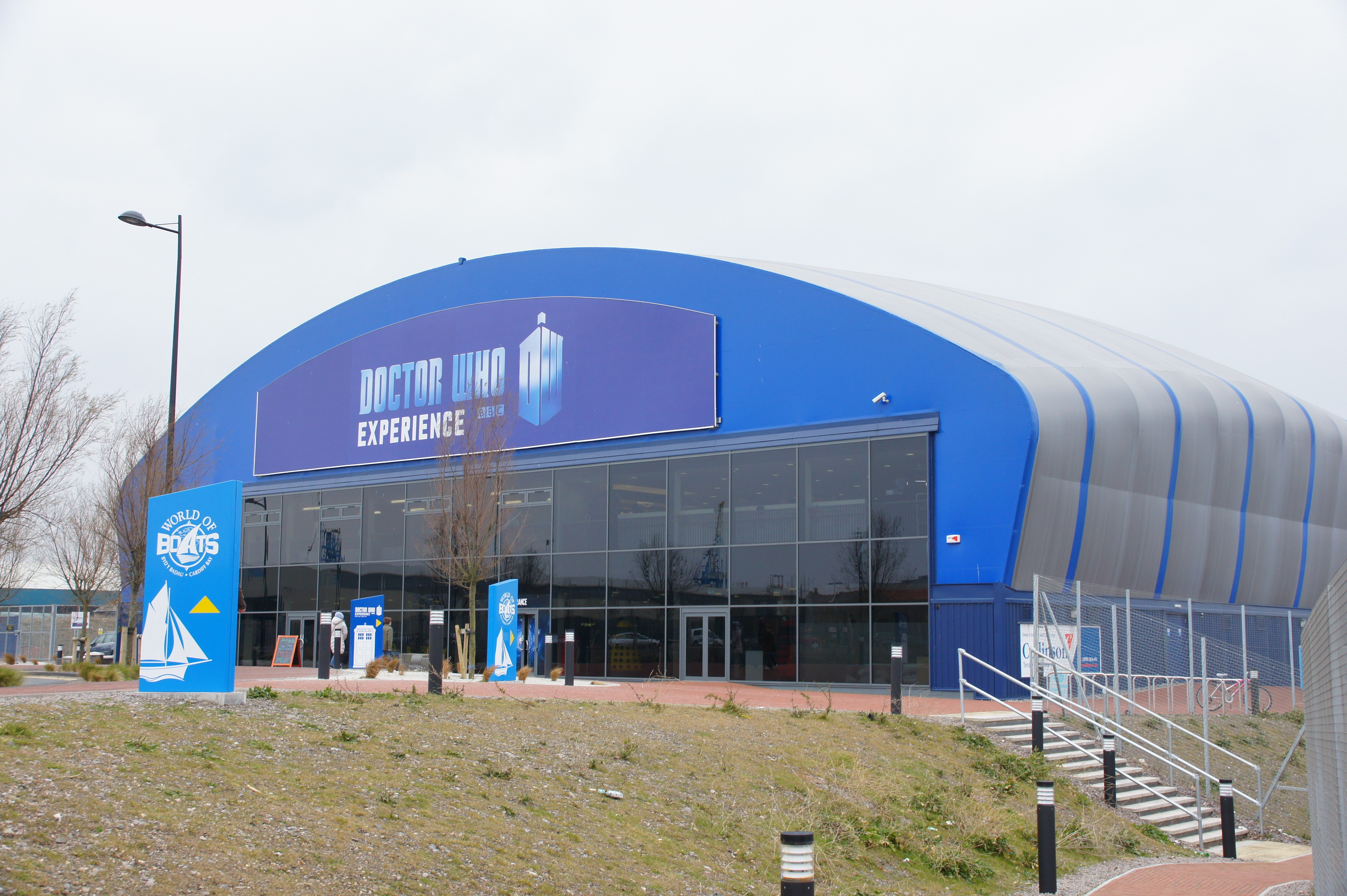
Entrance to the Doctor Who Experience in Cardiff

Since the first broadcast of the British science-fiction television serial Doctor Who in 1963, there have been a number of exhibitions of props, costumes, and sets relating to the show throughout the United Kingdom. Some have been intended to be permanent, and others seasonal; most have been staged at existing tourist locations.

== Current exhibitons ==
=== Doctor Who: Worlds of Wonder (2022–present) ===
Worlds of Wonder, subtitled 'Where Science Meets Fiction' , is a touring semi-permanent museum exhibit that was first displayed in the United Kingdom before going international.

The exhibit features costumes of every Doctor, various props including sonic screwdrivers, a 'hall of monsters' with many monster costumes and heads including Daleks, Cybermen, Davros, Weeping Angels and many more. The main focus of the exhibit is how the show derides fiction from science thus creating science fiction, for example how the Judoon are based on rhinoceros, and features specially-filmed video segments with narration from Mark Gatiss, and a pseudo-animatronic of Lady Cassandra with new voice lines by Zoë Wanamaker.

The first incarnation opened in May 2022 in Liverpool, England before moving to Edinburgh, Scotland later that year and closing the following May. The exhibit then reopened in June 2024 in Wellington, New Zealand, and closed in October.

The current home of Worlds of Wonder is in San Diego, California in the United States, having opened in March 2025. Initially set to close in March 2026, it was extended to January 2027.<

== Former permanent exhibitions ==
=== Longleat (1973–2003) ===
The first permanent exhibition was set up at the stately home of Longleat, Wiltshire in 1973, and ran until 2003. The site has also hosted annual Doctor Who conventions, usually in August.

The twentieth anniversary convention was titled "Twenty Years of a Time Lord" and was held in April 1983. It featured appearances from Jon Pertwee (and the vintage car Bessie), Peter Davison, K9; props included the TARDIS, Daleks, and the set of "The Five Doctors" feature-length special. About 40,000 fans turned up, many more than expected.

In 2003, the annual "Doctor Who Day", to mark the 40th anniversary of the programme, featured an attempt to gather the largest number of Daleks ever assembled. Colin Baker, Sophie Aldred and John Leeson attended.

=== The Doctor Who Exhibition, Blackpool (1974–1985) ===
The original Doctor Who Exhibition in Blackpool, Lancashire featured a range of monsters, aliens, props, costumes and models from the classic TV series, together with a TARDIS console that had previously featured in the BBC Visual Effects exhibition at the Science Museum, London. The Blackpool exhibition was located at 111 Central Promenade Blackpool. It was first opened by Jon Pertwee [Third Doctor] and Elisabeth Sladen [Sarah Jane Smith] on Tuesday 9 April 1974. The exhibition opened to the public the next day. From the outside, of the Chapel Street entrance, visitors saw only a blue Police box standing next to the building, looking as if it would only hold one or two people at the most. However, in keeping with the TARDIS from the TV series it was "bigger on the inside", an illusion created with stairs leading down from the TARDIS doors to the exhibition itself in a former cellar. The idea for the exhibition came from Terry Sampson of BBC Enterprises with his vision being realised by designer Tom Carter. It was open from April through to October each year, with new exhibits being introduced annually, mainly in keeping with the show's past or present, but occasionally previewing what was yet to come. In its first season, the Blackpool exhibition, saw a large spider from Planet of the Spiders greeting visitors at the top of the stairs, and a Tyrannosaur, from Invasion of the Dinosaurs, breaking through a wall at the bottom. A Triceratops was seen on the London Underground. Those in attendance walked around a winding corridor with exhibits to either side, which originally included, an assortment of Daleks, together with a Cyberman, Sontaran, Yeti, Sea Devil, Silurian, Draconian, and Ogron. The passageways eventually led to a reconstruction of the TARDIS console room, complete with a hexagonal console in the centre, flashing lights, sound effects and large windows looking out onto alien worlds and their monsters. All around the edges of the room were interactive computer banks, buttons and levers. Over the years, numerous other aliens were added to the displays including, an Ice Warrior, Quark, Zygon, Wirrn, a thirteen-foot high Robot, Sutekh, and The Doctor mechanical dog K9. The mainstay of the exhibition however was the Daleks, some of which were built especially by Tony Oxley and Charlie Lumm of the BBC Visual Effects department. Life size, moving Daleks were made to be as scary as possible with various Daleks interrogating and threatening the public with extermination. The Dalek Cavern as seen through the window of the console room, at various points incorporated the Gold Dalek, together with the sets and other Daleks from, Genesis of the Daleks, Destiny of the Daleks, Resurrection of the Daleks, and Revelation of the Daleks. Arguably the most popular set featured Davros, the Daleks creator. The egress of the TARDIS featured a BBC Enterprises gift shop. The exhibition closed in October 1985. Tom Baker [Fourth Doctor] had visited the exhibition in 1975 and 1977. Colin Baker [Sixth Doctor], and Nicola Bryant [Peri Brown] visited in 1985, as part of that year's Children in Need. The programme was broadcast on 22 November 1985, with film of Colin's visit to the exhibition being shown prior to 20 Doctor Who stars emerging from the TARDIS, live in the studio. At one point, Colin points to a Doctor Who fan in the audience, who he'd previously met at Blackpool, a man now known in Doctor Who circles as "The Man In Blue".

=== The Dr Who Experience, Llangollen (1994–2003) ===
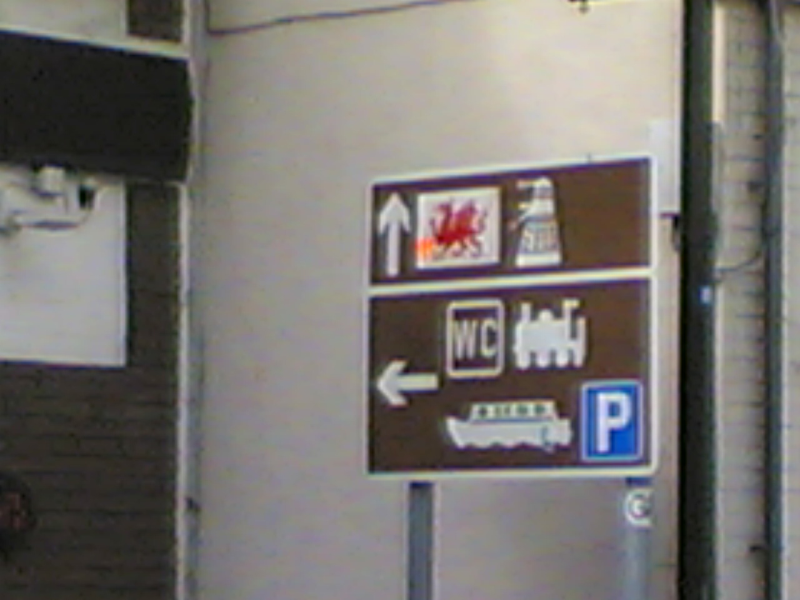
Road sign in Llangollen featuring a Dalek pointing to the Dr Who Experience

The "Dapol Dr Who Experience" opened in 1994 and was sited in Llangollen, Denbighshire, Wales, under the auspices of the company that made Doctor Who merchandise until 2002. It featured many costumes and props, some dating back to the 1960s. It closed in 2003.

=== The Doctor Who Exhibition, Blackpool (2004–2009) ===
The Blackpool exhibition reopened in 2004 to coincide with the relaunch of the Doctor Who television programme. The Blackpool Doctor Who Museum finally closed on 8 November 2009, the large collection of props, monsters and costumes (including the Doctors' trademark car, Bessie, and classic monsters such as Tractators, Ice Warriors and Yeti) being distributed to other exhibitions around the country.

=== The Doctor Who Exhibition, Cardiff (2005–2011) ===
Exhibits at the Doctor Who Exhibition Cardiff

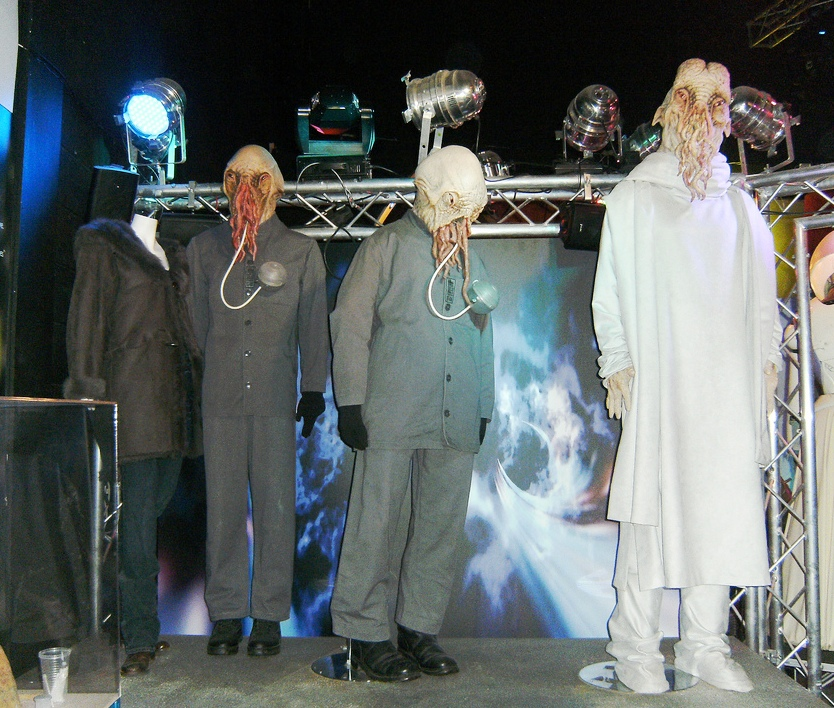
The Ood

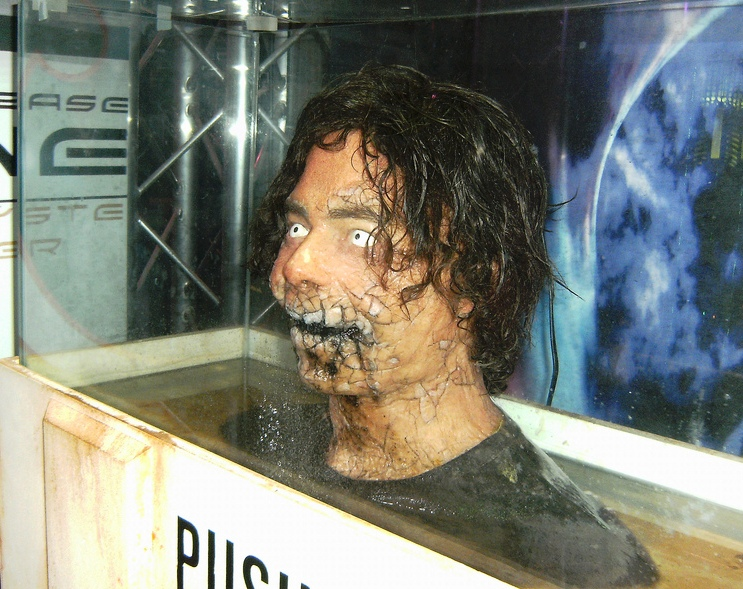
Tarak Ital

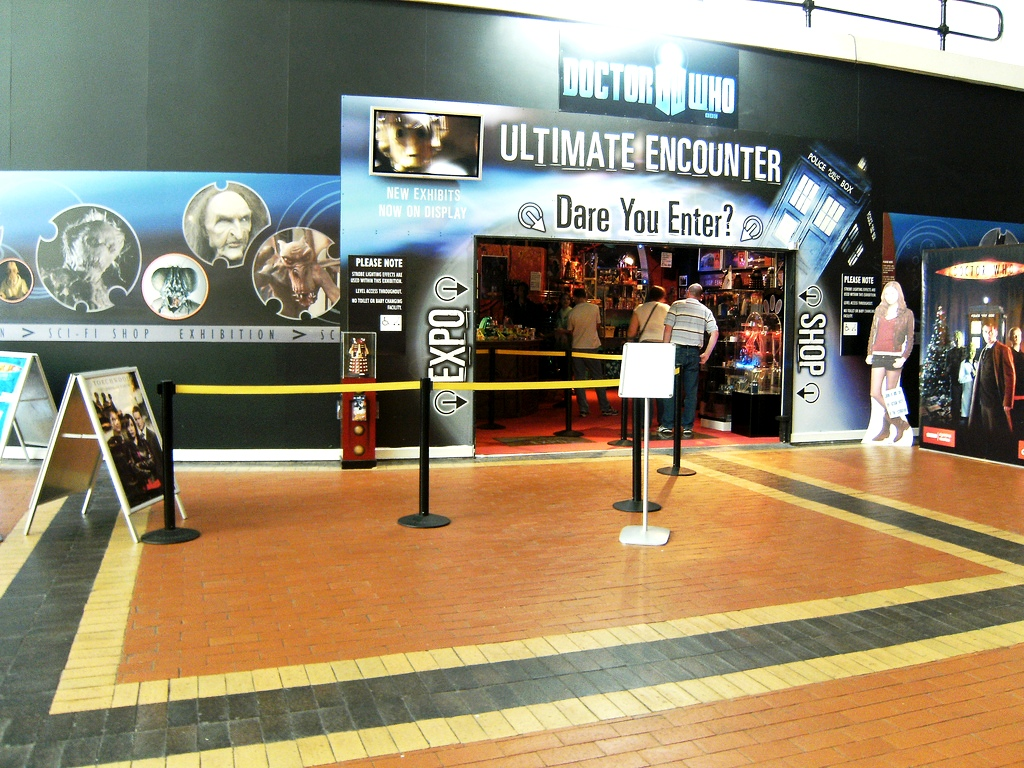
Entrance to the Doctor Who Exhibition

The Doctor Who Exhibition Cardiff was the only semi-permanent exhibition in the UK. Situated in the Red Dragon Centre, Cardiff Bay, the museum opened December 2005, in the city where the series is currently recorded and produced. It was closed on 27 March 2011, and the Doctor Who Experience opened on the other side of Cardiff bay in July 2012.

Props on display included an Ood Elder from "The End of Time", a fly-headed Tritovore and Lady Christina De Souza's costume from "Planet of the Dead", plus the 'Flood' monster and Maggie and Tarak Ital costumes from "The Waters of Mars". There was also a special display from the team behind the show's monsters, Millennium FX, showing the production process behind creating an Ood. Costumes displayed included those worn by the characters Martha Jones, Captain Jack Harkness, Donna Noble and the Doctor.

The Cardiff Exhibition had a complete refurbishment in October 2008.

The Doctor Who Up Close Shop was stocked with items such as giant inflatable Daleks, sonic screwdrivers and talking bottle openers.

=== The Doctor Who Experience (2012–2017) ===
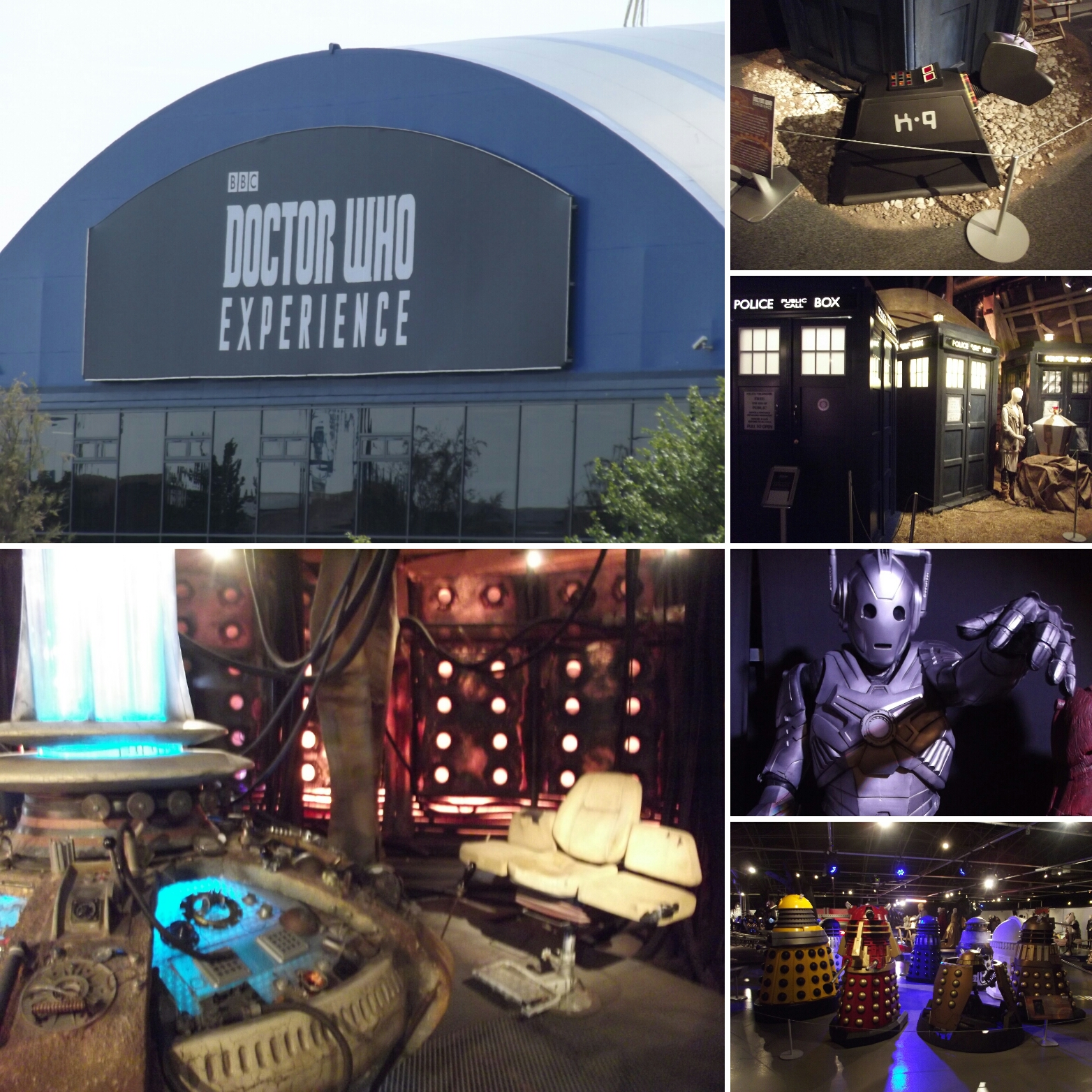
Exhibitions in the Doctor Who Experience

An exhibition titled Doctor Who Experience, complete with a new interactive Doctor Who episode with the Eleventh Doctor, opened at London Olympia on 20 February 2011 after a number of test days and preview visits. It closed on 22 February 2012.

The exhibition moved to Cardiff, opening on 20 July 2012. The new exhibition was housed in an unusual 3000 square metre building in Porth Teigr designed by theme-park company Sarner Ltd. Due to the temporary nature of the exhibition, with a 5-year lease on the site, the building was constructed like a large tent, with a cover stretched over curved steel beams.

The exhibition began with a short film and a walk-through adventure inside the Eleventh Doctor's first TARDIS interior and in various locations. Later, after the replacement of Matt Smith, visitors were instead led through the experience by a guide and the Twelfth Doctor (Peter Capaldi).

Following the adventure portion guests were free to roam two floors of exhibitions including original costumes from ten of the twelve Doctors (the first two being replicas as the originals were lost). Alien prosthetics, Daleks and Cybermen over history, Sonic devices, and the TARDIS interiors belonging to the First Doctor, Fourth Doctor, Fifth Doctor, and the Ninth Doctor and Tenth Doctor. Many other show memorabilia and artefacts were also on display, including costumes from the companions since 2005 including: Rose Tyler, Martha Jones, Donna Noble, Captain Jack Harkness, Amy Pond and Rory Williams.

Each year since opening, costumes and props used from new series were showcased. In 2013, props, such as Porridge's costume, the deactivated chess-playing Cyberman (from "Nightmare in Silver") the costumes of the Eleventh Doctor and Clara Oswald, along with the giant snow globe from the Christmas episode entitled "The Snowmen", were also added to the collection. In late 2014 props and costumes from "Last Christmas" were added.

Museum patrons could also take pictures in front of a green screen, with multiple backgrounds to choose from including Totter's Lane (from the Doctor's first adventure) and inside the time vortex, as well as several props such as various Sonic Screwdrivers and articles of clothing symbolic to several Doctors (e.g. Matt Smith's fez).

Cardiff Bay is home to the BBC Roath Lock production studios, as well as locations from the Torchwood series. The experience closed on 9 September 2017, due to the site's five-year lease running out. BBC Worldwide said at the time that they were "not sure yet" if it would reopen elsewhere.

== Former temporary and touring exhibitions ==
- 1982–1986 & 1999: The Doctor Who Experience, Madame Tussauds wax museum, London
- 1986–1988: Doctor Who USA Tour / Doctor Who Celebration & Tour 87–88, US
- 1988–1989: The Space Adventure, London
- 1988 Fan exhibition at Paisley Museum and Art Galleries (part of Paisley 500 Celebrations) - opened by Sylvester McCoy
- 1990: Museum of Childhood, Edinburgh
- 1991–1994: Museum of the Moving Image (MOMI), London. This exhibition was titled "Behind The Sofa" and after closing at MOMI moved to the Exploratory, Bristol.
- The MOMI "Behind the Sofa" exhibition also moved to Paisley Museum & Art Galleries in spring 1992, with an accompanying display of Dr Who art by local artists. An event featuring several Dr Who guests was held by JNT's Teynham Productions at the nearby Paisley Arts Centre.
- 1990 - 1992: Annual exhibitions at Uddingston Library, South Lanarkshire - 1992 exhibition opened by Terrance Dicks
- 1993: Official 30th Anniversary Exhibition as part of the Birmingham Doctor Who Festival. Science Museum, Birmingham. Organised by the local Wolves of Fenric club with the BBC and local council.
- 1993: Spaceblasters
- 1994: The Needles, Alum Bay, Isle of Wight – a summer attraction.
- 1997: Hamilton Central Library - opened by Terrance Dicks
- 1998: Uddingston Library, South Lanarkshire
- 1998: The Dick Institute, Kilmarnock - opened by Raymond P. Cusick
- 1999: Viewfield Museum, Nairn
- 1999: The Meffan Institute, Forfar, Angus
- 2002: Derby Industrial Museum
- 2002: Dunfermline Pittencrieff House Museum - opened by Barry Letts and Terrance Dicks
- 2002: MOMI, Sheffield
- 2002: Smith Art Gallery and Museum, Stirling
- 2004: Motherwell Heritage Centre
- 2005: National Museum of Photography, Film and Television, Bradford
- 2005: Brighton Pier
- 2005: National Space Centre, Leicester
- 2006: National Waterfront Museum, Swansea
- 2006: Spaceport, Merseyside – September 2006 to January 2007 and May 2008 to March 2009.
- 2007: MOSI, Manchester – March 2007 to January 2008 The exhibit featured Daleks, Cybermen, a Slitheen and the Racnoss.
- 2007: National Space Centre, Leicester – November 2007 to January 2008. Featured the Emperor Dalek, the Moxx of Balhoon, Slitheen, Auton and pigmen from Daleks in Manhattan.
- 2007: Land's End, Cornwall – April 2007 to January 2011.
- 2007: Dorking Museum
- 2007: Paisley Museum & Art Galleries
- 2007: Out of the Box Exhibition, Rook Lane Chapel, Frome, Somerset. A showcase of the box art of Doctor Who collectables, made by the illustrator Graham Humphreys. The exhibition also included a life sized red Dalek.
- 2008: Earls Court Exhibition Centre, London – Easter 2008 to January 2009
- 2009: Coventry Transport Museum – March 2009 to early 2010.
- 2009: Kelvingrove Museum, Glasgow – a year-long exhibition, it closed in January 2010. The exhibition featured many props from the 2005 series, including the Tardis, Cybermen, Daleks, Autons, K9, Hath, Judoon, Abzorbaloff, Weeping Angels, Ood, The Host, Sybilline Sisterhood, Cassandra, Face of Boe, Sisters of Plenitude and Sontarans, as well as many character costumes and sets.
- 2010: City Museum, Portsmouth – June 2010 to January 2011. Part of the Alien Invasion exhibition of film and TV props and costumes. Displays include a Dalek from Daleks – Invasion Earth: 2150 A.D., a suit worn by Tom Baker, an Ood, K-9, the TARDIS and a Sontaran.
- 2010: Centre for Life, Newcastle upon Tyne – May 2010 - October 2010. Featured props and costumes from the series between 2005 (Series 1) and 2010 (Series 5).
- 2013: November 2013 - February 2014 - Doctor Who and Me - National Science and Media Museum, Bradford - an exhibition celebrating the series' 50th anniversary through the eyes of Doctor Who fans and their collections and creations.
- 2015: Made in Wales Exhibition. Original costumes and props from a private collection
- 2015: Doctor Who Exhibition, ABC television headquarters, Ultimo, Sydney, 15 August 2013 - 31 January 2014.
- 2025: Beyond the Stars: A Propmaker's Guide to the Galaxy at Discover Bucks Museum in Aylesbury, England from March to October
- 2025: Adventures in Time & Space – an unofficial Doctor Who exhibition at Peterborough Museum, England from May to November.
