= Edward of Wessex =

Edward of Wessex may refer to:

Anglo-Saxon, English, and British Royals

- Edward the Elder (c. 870 – 924), King of Wessex
- Edward the Martyr (c. 962 – 978), King of the English
- Edward the Confessor (c. 1003 – 1066), King of the English
- Prince Edward, Duke of Edinburgh (born 1964), youngest child of Queen Elizabeth II (1952 – 2022), and brother of King Charles III (2022 to current), was titled Prince Edward, Earl of Wessex until his brother's ascension in 2023.

Fictional Characters

- Edward of Wessex, fictional character played by Alan Rowe in the Doctor Who serial The Time Warrior
