= Stuart Fell =

British actor and stuntman (born 1942)

- Born: Stuart Ian Fell; 10 March 1942 (age 84); Morecambe, Lancashire, United Kingdom
- Occupations: Actor, stuntman
- Spouse: Kathleen Hockley (m. 1967)

Stuart Fell (born 10 March 1942) is a professional actor and stuntman known particularly for his work with the British science fiction show Doctor Who.

== Early life ==
Fell was born in Morecambe in the English county of Lancashire. His father served in the Royal Air Force during World War II and so the family "travelled around a lot", Fell told an interviewer, including a posting in Scotland. Prior to his television and film career, Fell worked as an electronics tester and then joined the British Army, serving in the Parachute Regiment.

== Career ==
He has appeared on British television many times, with his earliest role being in the LWT comedy series Hark at Barker, in which he plays the driver of a car that crashes when he's distracted by Ronnie Barker carrying a mannequin. In 1971, he appeared as an uncredited extra in the Doctor Who serial Terror of the Autons, and his last role came in 1998, as a stuntman in Duck Patrol.

He worked in over twenty Doctor Who stories in all, from 1971 to 1983, as a stuntman, actor, and once (in 1981) as a fight arranger. He played the role of Dennis Moore when on horseback in Monty Python's Flying Circus, doubling for John Cleese.

His small size made him ideal for a number of roles. He was able to get inside a number of small, cramped costumes and even doubled for Katy Manning and Louise Jameson (wearing their costumes on both occasions). His large range of varied skills earned him praise. In several DVD commentaries, he was praised for his range of skills including juggling, fire-breathing, acrobatics, stilt-walking and riding a motorcycle. Even as a newcomer to stunt work, he was eager to prove himself. One example was in The Claws of Axos, where he is shot and then flipped backwards on a wire rig.

He became well known within the series for a number of instances, one being a stunt in which he performed an (unpaid) back flip when he "died" in The Sea Devils. He also had to stand in for Kevin Lindsay in The Sontaran Experiment when Lindsay's heart condition made it too difficult for him to complete his lengthy fight scene. Another notable instance was in The Invasion of Time, in which he improvised a jump (in full costume) and almost fell down as he landed on a folding chair. He then fell over a chair thrown at him to only narrowly stop himself from rolling into the location's swimming pool. The whole sequence ended up being used in the final version. Fell explained, in a 2004 documentary, that he was encouraged to improvise and it was felt that these trips made the scenes more interesting.

He played minor parts in three episodes of Blake's 7.

He appeared in television adaptations of Hamlet, The Mayor of Casterbridge and The Old Curiosity Shop. He has appeared in The Empire Strikes Back, the first two Superman films, three James Bond films, Aliens and Who Framed Roger Rabbit. Most of his film work was as a stunt man.

Fell was latterly a professional juggler. He is a member of The Magic Circle and once appeared on the Antiques Roadshow as an unnamed member of the public demonstrating his collection of yo-yos, diabolos and other conjuring toys.

He appeared at the Time Quest 2009 Doctor Who convention, where he took part in signings, panels and photo shoots with attendees. He also dressed as a jester and attracted very large queues. His panel was the most visited of the day other than Tom Baker's.

== Appearances in Doctor Who ==
- 1971: Terror of the Autons: Stuntman
- 1971: The Mind of Evil: Stuntman, various characters
- 1971: The Claws of Axos: stuntman, UNIT Soldier
- 1972: The Curse of Peladon: the body of Alpha Centauri
- 1972: The Sea Devils: Stuntman, Jo Grant, 'Junior' Sea Devil
- 1973: Carnival of Monsters: Functionary
- 1974: The Monster of Peladon: the body of Alpha Centauri
- 1974: Planet of the Spiders: Stuntman, Tramp
- 1975: The Ark in Space: Operated various creature costumes
- 1975: The Sontaran Experiment: Doubled for Kevin Lindsay in the Styre costume
- 1975: The Android Invasion: Unnamed Kraal
- 1976: The Brain of Morbius: The body of Morbius
- 1976: The Masque of Mandragora: Stuntman, various characters
- 1977: The Face of Evil: Tesh guard
- 1977: The Talons of Weng-Chiang: Giant Rat, stuntwork
- 1977: The Sun Makers: Guard
- 1978: The Invasion of Time: Lead Sontaran Trooper
- 1978: The Ribos Operation: Played the 'Shrivenzale'
- 1980: Full Circle: Doubled for Leonard Maguire
- 1980: State of Decay: Roga, stuntman and fight Arranger
- 1982: The Visitation: Stuntman
- 1983: The Five Doctors: Stuntman
