= Terry Walsh (actor) =

British actor stuntman (1939–2002)

- Born: Terence Anthony Walsh; 5 May 1939; North Buckinghamshire, England
- Died: 21 April 2002 (aged 62); London, England
- Occupation: Stuntman
- Spouse: Gillian Dugdale (m. 1962; died 1995)

Terry Walsh (5 May 1939 – 21 April 2002) was a British actor, stuntman, stunt arranger and fight arranger who contributed much to British television and film, especially during the 1970s. He stunt-doubled for Jon Pertwee, Michael Caine, Tom Baker and David Warner amongst others.

== Early life ==
Intending to become a research chemist whilst studying at college, Walsh failed his degree due to spending too much time playing in a jazz band. Following a spell in the army, he drove a friend to a film studio. There, he was impressed by a 60ft fall performed by Paddy Ryan, an honorary figure in the British stunt industry. For two years, Ryan proceeded to teach Walsh the various stunts and tricks of the trade.

== Career ==
Walsh is known for his work on the science fiction television programme Doctor Who. He worked on the show from 1966 to 1979.

He was also the stunt co-ordinator for Robin of Sherwood, devising three sword fighting sequences, which subsequently became standard movements on television and film. The moves were known as Robin Hood 1, 2 and 3. Another Sherwood Forest-related production was Robin Hood: Prince of Thieves where Walsh flew out to the States to train Kevin Costner on how to fight with various weapons for his role as Robin Hood. In return, the movie star rewarded the stuntman with a visit to the top restaurant in Hollywood.

His other credits include The Sandbaggers, Tales of the Unexpected, Z-Cars, Space: 1999, Dixon of Dock Green and Softly, Softly.

== Personal life ==
When he wasn't stunting, Walsh drove a black-cab from Edgware station taxi-rank. With fellow stuntman Ken Sheppard, he ran a gun shop, Fieldsports Ltd in Totteridge Lane, Whetstone.

== Filmography ==
Year	Title	Role	Notes
1961	The Day the Earth Caught Fire	Man	Uncredited
1966	Alfie	Man in Pub Fight	Uncredited
1970	Cool It Carol!	Second London Taxi Driver	Uncredited
1976	Diversions	Mercenary Officer	
1978	Revenge of the Pink Panther	French Thug	Uncredited
1979	Dracula	Dead Sailor	Uncredited
1980	Union City	Paper Boy	
1980	Superman II	KFC Man / French Officer	Uncredited
1981	An American Werewolf in London	Taxi Driver Who Crashes His Cab	Uncredited
1982	The Man from Snowy River	Crack Rider #11	

== Doctor Who ==
Year	Episode	Role	Notes
1966	The Smugglers	Militiaman	uncredited
1968	The Web of Fear	Soldier at Covent Garden	uncredited
1968	The Invasion	UNIT Soldier	uncredited
1970	The Ambassadors of Death	UNIT Soldier	uncredited
1970	Inferno	RSF Soldier; UNIT Soldier	uncredited uncredited
1971	Terror of the Autons	Auton Policeman	Part Two-Three
1971	The Mind of Evil	Motor Cyclist; UNIT Soldier	uncredited uncredited
1971	Colony in Space	Rogers; Colonist; Primitive	uncredited uncredited uncredited
1972	The Curse of Peladon	Guard	uncredited
1972	The Sea Devils	Castle Guard Barclay; Sailor; Sea Devil	Part One and Three uncredited uncredited
1972	The Mutants	Overlord/Solos Guard	uncredited
1972	The Time Monster	Window Cleaner	Part One
1973	The Green Death	Guard	Part Four
1974	Invasion of the Dinosaurs	Warehouse Looter	Part One
1974	Death to the Daleks	Spaceman; Burning Exxilon; Exxilon Antibody	uncredited uncredited uncredited
1974	The Monster of Peladon	Guard Captain; Guard	uncredited
1974	Planet of the Spiders	Man with Boat	Part Two
1974–75	Robot	SRS Bouncer	uncredited
1975	The Sontaran Experiment	Zake	Part One
1975	Genesis of the Daleks	Soldier; Thal Soldier; Muto; Scientist	uncredited uncredited uncredited uncredited
1975	Revenge of the Cybermen	Vogan	uncredited
1975	Planet of Evil	Crew Member	uncredited
1976	The Masque of Mandragora	Executioner	uncredited
1977	The Face of Evil	Horda Pit Guard	uncredited
1978–79	The Power of Kroll	Mensch	Part One-Two
1979	The Creature from the Pit	Doran	Part One-Two
1993	Dimensions in Time	Third Doctor	Part Two
