= Carey Blyton =

British composer

- Born: Carey Blyton; 14 March 1932; Beckenham, Kent, England
- Died: 13 July 2002 (aged 70) Woodbridge, Suffolk, England
- Occupations: Composer, music editor
- Years active: 1948–2002

Carey Blyton (14 March 1932 – 13 July 2002) was a British composer and writer best known for his song "Bananas in Pyjamas" (1969)—which later became the theme tune for an Australian children's television series—and for his work on Doctor Who. Having had a late start to his career, he mainly worked as a miniaturist, composing short orchestral scores and humorous pieces such as "Return of Bulgy Gogo", "Up the Faringdon Road", "Mock Joplin" and "Saxe Blue"; in addition, he assisted Benjamin Britten as a music editor.

Blyton wrote incidental music for three stories in the BBC Doctor Who television series: Doctor Who and the Silurians (1970), Death to the Daleks (1974), and Revenge of the Cybermen (1975). He was noted for his use of primitive musical instruments, using crumhorns to depict the Silurians in Doctor Who and the Silurians, and serpents and ophicleides in Revenge of the Cybermen. Several CDs of his work were produced, notably Sherlock Holmes meets Dr Who, showcasing his work for an unmade Sherlock Holmes animated series, cues from all three of his Doctor Who stories, and other classics such as Saxe Blue.

His career was prolific, and he died in Suffolk, aged 70.

== Early life and career ==
=== Early life ===
Blyton was born in Beckenham, Kent, on 14 March 1932. He was the second child and only son of Hanly and Floss Blyton, and had an elder sister, Yvonne. A nephew of children's author Enid Blyton, he was educated at a grammar school and showed an interest in science and a hostility towards music. He developed polio at age sixteen and during his recovery was taught piano as a pastime. This was the starting point of his formation and career in music; in the 1950s he officially began training as a composer.

=== Music education ===
The years from 1948 (when Blyton began to take piano lessons and start to show an increasing interest in music) to 1953 (when he commenced his formal training as a musician) were crucial years, in which his style as a composer was forged. In 1953 he entered Trinity College of Music, London, by examination, obtaining all three college diplomas (Associate, Licentiate and Fellow) during his four years there, and in 1954 won the Sir Granville Bantock Prize for Composition. He studied harmony, counterpoint, orchestration and musical history with Dr William Lovelock, piano with Joan Barker, harpsichord with Valda Aveling, and viola with Alison Milne.

In 1957 he obtained a B.Mus. (London) degree and was awarded a 10-month scholarship in composition tenable at Det Kongelige Danske Musikkonservatorium (Copenhagen, Denmark), by the Sir Winston Churchill Endowment Fund. There he studied composition, musical analysis and more advanced orchestration with the Danish composer Jörgen Jersild. Returning to England in 1958, he became music editor to Mills Music Ltd in Denmark Street ('Tin Pan Alley'), a position he held for five years.

From June 1963 he freelanced as a composer, arranger, music editor, and lecturer. He was professor of Harmony, Counterpoint & Orchestration at Trinity College of Music (London) from 1963 to 1973, and visiting professor of Composition for Film, Television & Radio at the Guildhall School of Music and Drama (London) from 1972 to 1983, where he pioneered the first course of tuition in these specialised aspects of musical composition at a musical conservatory in this country. In September 1964, he was appointed music editor to the Music Department of Faber and Faber Ltd (now Faber Music Ltd), a position he held until 1974. While at Faber's he was Benjamin Britten's personal editor; after that, from 1963 to 1971, he was responsible for the editorial work on Britten's works from Curlew River to Owen Wingrave, and on many works by Gustav Holst.

== Career development ==
Blyton was primarily a miniaturist, composing mainly songs, chamber music and short orchestral scores. His works include a series of guitar pieces for the Italian guitarist Angelo Gilardino, published by Edizioni Bèrben, and about a dozen works for the London Saxophone Quartet, mainly involving wind instruments and works reflecting his life-long interest in the music and art of the East—particularly Japan. He was also interested in writing, as shown in various commissions from the BBC (British Broadcasting Corporation) for schools cantatas in the series Music Workshop, the incidental music for three Dr Who serials, the Victorian mini-melodramas, and a number of books for children, including Bananas in Pyjamas: a book of nonsense songs and poems.

Blyton enjoyed something of an 'Indian summer' of creativity in his last years, though generally, he was prolific throughout his life. Late works of particular note nearly all exhibit his leanings toward 'the mysterious East', from In The Spice Markets of Zanzibar for the brass quintet to Lyrics from the East for tenor and piano (a short epigrammatic song-cycle based on Eastern poems). One of his last works was El Tango Ultimo for symphony orchestra. Also among these last compositions is Vale, Diana!, a tribute to Diana, Princess of Wales, scored for string orchestra, and his Dirge for St Patrick's Night.

=== Death ===
The 'Beckenham boy', Carey Blyton, was honoured by his home town in 2002 on the occasion of his 70th birthday by an exhibition and talk on his work at Beckenham Library. Blyton was unable to attend and died of cancer and post-polio syndrome on 13 July 2002 at Woodbridge in Suffolk, aged 70.
