= Planet of the Spiders =

074 – Planet of the Spiders
- Doctor Who serial

Cast
- Doctor: Jon Pertwee – Third Doctor
- Companion: Elisabeth Sladen – Sarah Jane Smith
- Others: Nicholas Courtney – Brigadier Lethbridge-Stewart; Richard Franklin – Mike Yates; John Levene – Sergeant Benton; John Dearth – Lupton; Carl Forgione – Land; Andrew Staines – Keaver; Terence Lodge – Moss; Christopher Burgess – Barnes; John Kane – Tommy; Kevin Lindsay – Cho-je; George Cormack – K'anpo; Cyril Shaps – Professor Clegg; Chubby Oates – Policeman; Pat Gorman – Soldier; Terry Walsh – Man with Boat; Michael Pinder – Hopkins; Stuart Fell – Tramp; Geoffrey Morris – Sabor; Ralph Arliss – Tuar; Gareth Hunt – Arak; Jenny Laird – Neska; Joanna Monro – Rega; Walter Randall, Max Faulkner – Guard Captains; Ysanne Churchman, Kismet Delgado, Maureen Morris – Spider Voices

Production
- Directed by: Barry Letts
- Written by: Robert Sloman; Barry Letts (uncredited)
- Script editor: Terrance Dicks
- Produced by: Barry Letts (uncredited)
- Music by: Dudley Simpson
- Production code: ZZZ
- Series: Season 11
- Running time: 6 episodes, 25 minutes each
- First broadcast: 4 May 1974
- Last broadcast: 8 June 1974

Chronology
← Preceded by The Monster of Peladon	Followed by → Robot

Planet of the Spiders is the fifth and final serial of the 11th season of the British science fiction television series Doctor Who, which was first broadcast in six weekly parts on BBC1 from 4 May to 8 June 1974. It was Jon Pertwee's final regular appearance as the Third Doctor, the last regular appearance of Mike Yates, and marks the first, uncredited appearance of Tom Baker as the Fourth Doctor. This serial introduces the term "regenerate" to explain the Doctor's transformation into another appearance. It also contains the first mention in the series of future companion Harry Sullivan.

In this serial, a group of men at a Tibetan centre in rural England make contact with a race of giant spiders with psychic abilities from the planet Metebelis 3, who intend to conquer Earth.

== Plot ==
Following the events of Invasion of the Dinosaurs, Mike Yates is discharged from UNIT and joins a Tibetan meditation centre in rural England for therapy. He asks Sarah Jane Smith to visit him and investigate a group organised by a resident named Lupton. Mike and Sarah witness Lupton perform an incantation that conjures a giant spider, which takes control of him. The spider has come to Earth to seek a certain blue crystal.

The Third Doctor has developed an interest in human psychic ability, and his experiments include testing the blue crystal which he brought from the planet Metebelis Three which he visited during The Green Death. The experiments show images of giant spiders. Sarah returns from the monastery, and she and the Doctor compare spider stories. Meanwhile Lupton's spider has traced the crystal to UNIT HQ, whereupon Lupton travels there and steals the crystal from the Doctor’s laboratory. A multi-vehicle chase ensues.

Lupton escapes by his spider teleporting him back to the monastery, where it reveals that it too comes from Metebelis Three. Before the spider can contact Metabilis, the crystal is stolen from Lupton by Tommy, the monastery's handyman, an innocent with developmental difficulties, who is drawn to the crystal. Sarah has recognised Lupton, and she and the Doctor quickly arrive at the monastery to warn the lama in charge, Cho-je, about Lupton's strange powers. Lupton is compelled to flee with the spider to Metebelis without the crystal. Sarah secretly follows but is captured by the Eight-Legs - as the spiders call themselves.

The Doctor arrives in the TARDIS to rescue her and begins organising a resistance movement among the human slaves, descendants of the crew of an Earth spaceship that crashed centuries before, whom the spiders prey on. The planet is ruled by the giant spiders, who also came from the crashed ship, but whose mental powers have been amplified by centuries of exposure to the blue crystals inside the mountains of Metabilis. The Queen Spider seems to be the ruler, but in the Blue Mountains the Doctor encounters the Great One, an enormous spider who is really in control, who now desires power over other worlds. She craves the crystal, which she insanely believes will infinitely expand her mental powers and give her dominion over the universe.

The Great One sends the Doctor to Earth to get the crystal for her. He flees with Sarah, unaware that the Queen Spider - who also craves the crystal - has taken over Sarah's mind. At the monastery, Tommy has been effected by the crystal, expanding his intelligence, just as it has for the spiders. He gives it into the safe-keeping of the abbot, K’anpo Rimpoche, an elderly Time Lord (and former guru of the Doctor) who has retired as a Tibetan Buddhist on Earth.

K'anpo uses the crystal to free Sarah's mind from the Queen, killing the Queen. A force of spiders arrives, and a battle breaks out in the monastery for the crystal. K'anpo advises the Doctor to give the crystal back to the Great One, as the Doctor has caused the entire problem by taking it in the first place.

When the TARDIS arrives on Metebelis, Lupton tries to seize the crystal but is killed by the spiders, who are afraid of the Great One. The Doctor returns to her cave and warns her of the dangers of using the crystal to complete the feedback loop she has built, but she is now insane. The forces released are so powerful that a vast wave of deadly radiation floods the mountain, killing the Great One and all the other spiders. The Doctor, weak and dying from the radiation, staggers back to the TARDIS which gets lost in the Time Vortex.

Three weeks later on Earth, Brigadier Lethbridge-Stewart and Sarah are in the Doctor's laboratory when the TARDIS materialises. Upon emerging, the Doctor collapses to the floor. K’anpo also materialises, having regenerated into the form of Cho-je, who was in fact a tulpa he generated - a secret earlier revealed by K'anpo to the Doctor and Sarah Jane. He tells them the Doctor can survive, by regenerating, although he will change his appearance. K’anpo initiates the process, and the Doctor regenerates into his next body.

== Production ==
Filming took place in rural England including Mortimer railway station in Berkshire

The final story of Season 11 (to have been titled The Final Game) was originally intended to write out the character of the Master (who would have been played by the recently-deceased Roger Delgado), with the villainous Time Lord sacrificing his life to save the Doctor.

Several exterior scenes were filmed on location near Membury in rural Wiltshire, and the manor house in Tidmarsh, Berkshire served as the meditation centre. The railway station at which Sarah Jane arrives in Part One is in Mortimer, near Reading, a major continuity error, as director Barry Letts' allows this to be identifiable on-screen in the establishing shot of the railway station, thereby placing the location of the Tibetan monastery in Berkshire, close to London. But the extensive location scenes in Part Two, filmed in Wiltshire and Gloucestershire, imply a setting of 'darkest Mummerset' in the wilds of the West Country.

Producer and director Barry Letts said in an interview in 2004, referring to the use of CSO (Colour Separation Overlay) to create backgrounds of the planet Metebelis in long-shot, that he was unhappy with the scenes, which "never looked right".

=== Cast notes ===
Ysanne Churchman had provided the voice of Alpha Centauri in both The Curse of Peladon (1972) and its sequel The Monster of Peladon (the serial immediately preceding Planet of the Spiders); she would briefly reprise the role in "Empress of Mars" (2017). Kismet Delgado, the widow of Roger Delgado, was one of the voices for the Spiders. Carl Forgione would later play Nimrod in Ghost Light (1989). Christopher Burgess had previously played Swann in The Enemy of the World (1968). Cyril Shaps who played Professor Clegg had previously appeared in The Tomb of the Cybermen (1967) and The Ambassadors of Death (1970) and would later appear in The Androids of Tara (1977). Kevin Lindsay had previously appeared in The Time Warrior (1973) as the Sontaran, Linx; and would re-appear the following season in The Sontaran Experiment (1975), as the Sontaran warrior Styre and as the Sontaran Marshal. John Dearth had provided the voice of the computer, BOSS, in The Green Death (1973).

== Broadcast and reception ==
Episode	Title	Run time	Original release date	UK viewers (millions)	Archive
1	"Part One"	24:40	4 May 1974	10.1	PAL 2" colour videotape
2	"Part Two"	25:02	11 May 1974	8.9	PAL 2" colour videotape
3	"Part Three"	24:58	18 May 1974	8.8	PAL 2" colour videotape
4	"Part Four"	23:53	25 May 1974	8.2	PAL 2" colour videotape
5	"Part Five"	24:01	1 June 1974	9.2	PAL 2" colour videotape
6	"Part Six"	24:43	8 June 1974	8.9	PAL 2" colour videotape

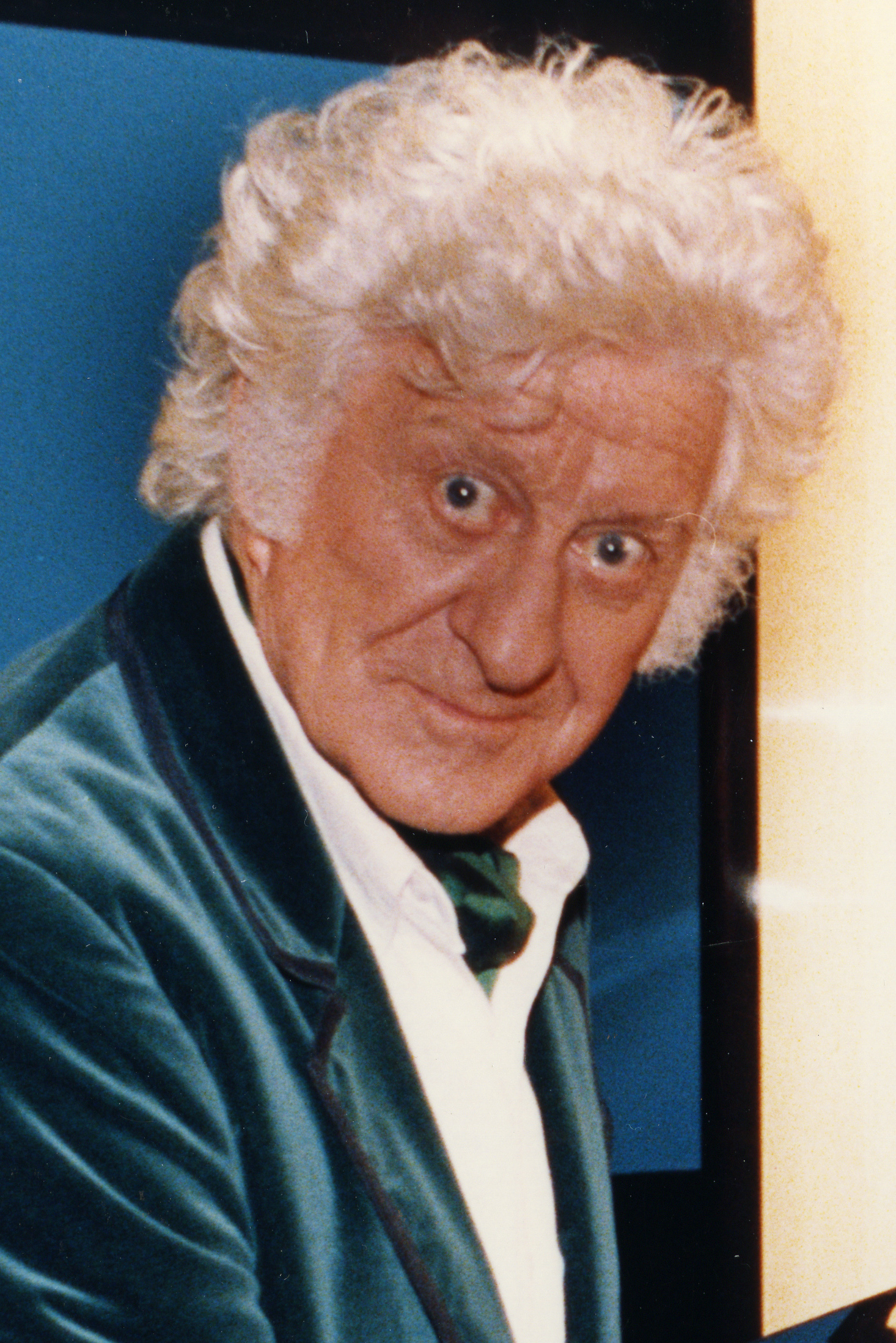
Jon Pertwee

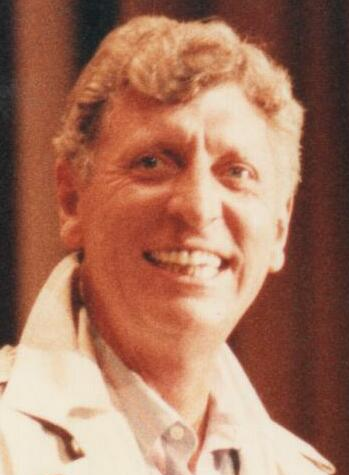
Tom Baker

The serial marks the last regular appearance of Jon Pertwee and introduces Tom Baker as the Doctor

The story was edited and condensed into a single omnibus episode broadcast on BBC1 at 2:45 pm on 27 December 1974, reaching 8.6 million viewers. The compilation was included on the DVD release of the complete story.

Paul Cornell, Martin Day, and Keith Topping wrote of the serial in The Discontinuity Guide (1995), "Grotesquely over padded and stuck with bad CSO, Planet of the Spiders is not the celebration of an era that it should have been." However, they felt that the regeneration scene "almost atones for this". In 2010, Patrick Mulkern of Radio Times awarded it four stars out of five. He praised the regeneration and wrote that the story was "fun". He noted that some of the cliffhangers were "unusually feeble", but the first was one of the best. DVD Talk's John Sinnott gave the story three out of five stars, writing that it was "enjoyable" despite "not the great sendoff that Pertwee should have received" with padding and weak special effects. Reviewing the serial for SFX, Ian Berriman rated the serial three and a half out of five stars and described it as "a mix of the fresh and the hokey". While he noted that some of the plot was repetitive and traditional, he praised the inclusion of Buddhism. In 2010, Alasdair Wilkins of io9 called the story a "mash-up of a bunch of different types of Third Doctor stories", but the plot was not enough to stretch out over six episodes and so a lot of unnecessary elements were added. However, Wilkins felt that it was a good thematic end for the Third Doctor, and named it the third best regeneration of the Doctor but the third worst regeneration story. In 2009, SFX listed Sarah Jane with the spider on her back as the tenth scariest Doctor Who moment.

== Commercial releases ==
=== In print ===
Doctor Who and the Planet of the Spiders
- Author: Terrance Dicks
- Cover artist: Peter Brookes
- Series: Doctor Who book: Target novelisations
- Release number: 48
- Publisher: Target Books
- Publication date: 16 October 1975
- ISBN: 0-426-10655-5

A novelisation of this serial, written by Terrance Dicks, was published by Target Books in October 1975 as Doctor Who and the Planet of the Spiders. The novel's prologue shows Jo Grant and her husband Professor Jones in the Amazon jungle following the events of The Green Death. Harry Sullivan is referred to as Doctor Sweetman.

=== Home media ===
The serial was released on VHS in April 1991 as a double pack. It was released on DVD in the UK on 18 April 2011, and in the USA and Canada on 10 May 2011. This serial was also released as part of the Doctor Who DVD Files in Issue 110 on 20 March 2013.
