= Kevin Lindsay =

Australian actor

- Born: Kevin Alan Lindsay; 17 April 1924; Bendigo, Victoria
- Died: 26 April 1975 (aged 51); Enfield, London, England
- Occupation: Actor

Kevin Lindsay (17 April 1924 – 26 April 1975) was an Australian actor, born in Bendigo, Victoria. He came to Britain in 1959 and is best known for his appearances in the Doctor Who series.

He appeared as Cho-Je in Planet of the Spiders, as well as playing Linx, the first Sontaran to be seen in the series, in The Time Warrior. Later, Lindsay played two more members of that species, in The Sontaran Experiment.

He died from a heart condition, nine days after his 51st birthday.

== Filmography ==
Year	Title	Role	Notes
1966	Love Story	Tommy Shuffles	
1966	Coronation Street	Doctor Connor	1 episode
1967	Crossroads	Luke	7 episodes
1968	Mr Rose	Harry Croaker	Episode: The Unlucky Dip
1968	Sherlock Holmes	George Norlett	Episode: Shoscombe Old Place
1970	Paul Temple	Victor Allan	Episode: Inside Information
1972	Z Cars	Man	Episode: Damage
1972	War and Peace	Naryshkin	Miniseries
1973–1975	Doctor Who	Linx/Cho Je/Styre/The Marshal	6 episodes, 3 stories
1974	Play for Today	Man at seaside	Episode: Eleanor
