= The Time Warrior =

1973–74 Doctor Who serial

070 – The Time Warrior
- Doctor Who serial

Cast
- Doctor: Jon Pertwee – Third Doctor
- Companion: Elisabeth Sladen – Sarah Jane Smith
- Others: Nicholas Courtney – Brigadier Lethbridge-Stewart; Kevin Lindsay – Commander Linx; David Daker – Irongron; John J. Carney – Bloodaxe; Alan Rowe – Edward of Wessex; June Brown – Lady Eleanor; Jeremy Bulloch – Hal; Donald Pelmear – Professor Rubeish; Sheila Fay – Meg; Gordon Pitt – Eric; Steve Brunswick – Sentry

Production
- Directed by: Alan Bromly
- Written by: Robert Holmes
- Script editor: Terrance Dicks
- Produced by: Barry Letts
- Executive producer: None
- Music by: Dudley Simpson
- Production code: UUU
- Series: Season 11
- Running time: 4 episodes, 25 minutes each
- First broadcast: 15 December 1973
- Last broadcast: 5 January 1974

Chronology
← Preceded by The Green Death	Followed by → Invasion of the Dinosaurs

The Time Warrior is the first serial of the 11th season of the British science fiction television series Doctor Who, which was first broadcast in four weekly parts on BBC1 from 15 December 1973 to 5 January 1974. The serial introduced Elisabeth Sladen as new companion Sarah Jane Smith. It also marked the debut of the Sontaran race. The serial also introduces the name of the Doctor's home planet, Gallifrey.

In the serial, the Sontaran Commander Linx (Kevin Lindsay) crash-lands his spaceship in medieval England. He agrees to give futuristic weaponry to the warrior Irongron (David Daker) and his men, in exchange for Linx being given shelter to perform repairs on the damaged spaceship.

== Plot ==
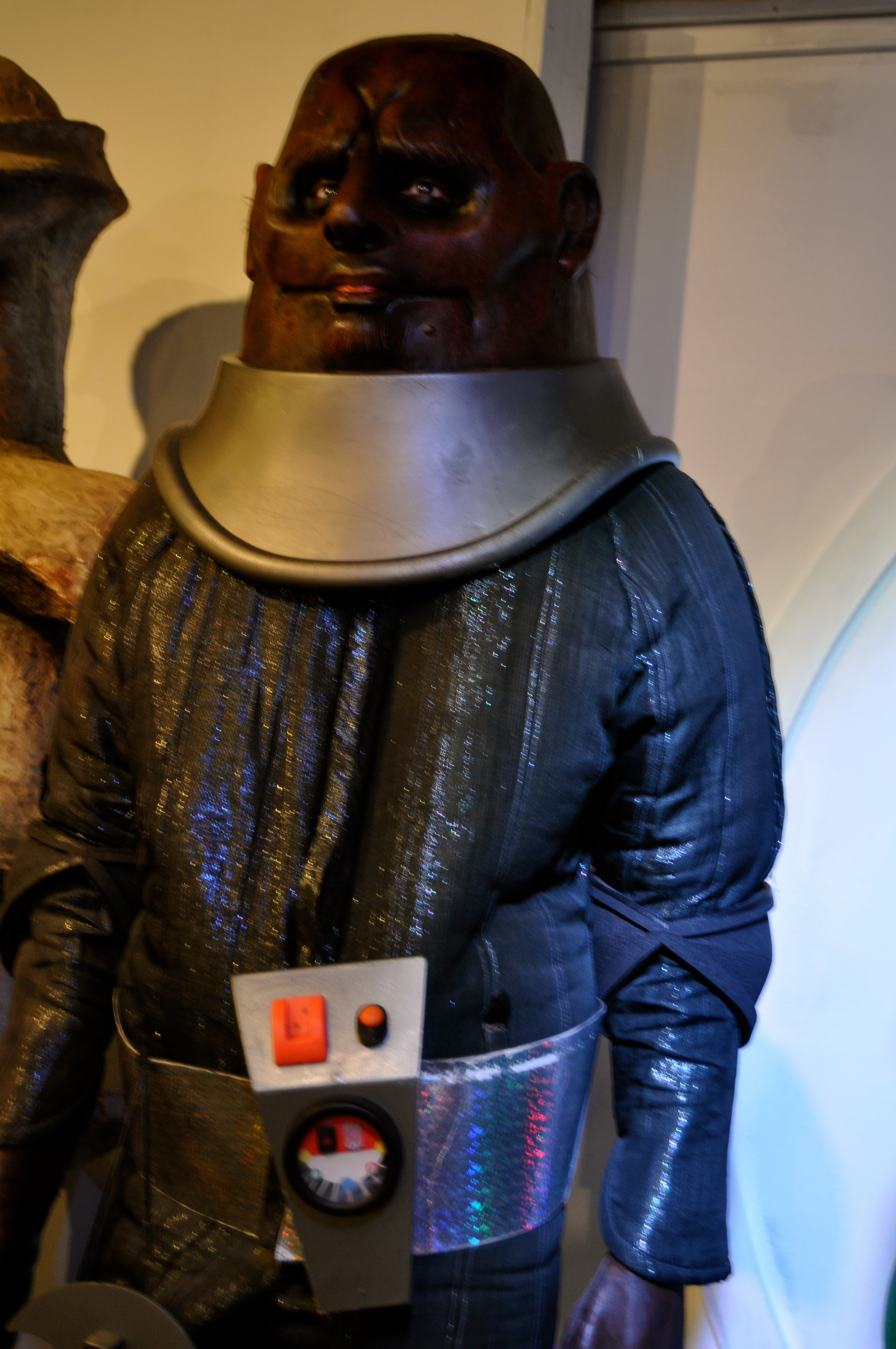
The Sontarans debuted in this serial, as shown here at the Doctor Who Experience.

In the Middle Ages, the bandit Irongron and his aide Bloodaxe, together with their rabble of criminals, find the crashed spaceship of a Sontaran warrior named Linx. The alien claims Earth for his Empire, then sets about repairing his ship, offering Irongron “magic weapons” that will make him a king in return for shelter. Linx sends himself forward to the 20th century and kidnaps scientists from a top secret scientific research complex, then hypnotises them into making repairs on his ship.

The Third Doctor and Brigadier Lethbridge-Stewart are investigating the disappearance of the scientists. The Doctor meets an eccentric scientist called Rubeish and journalist Sarah Jane Smith. Later that evening Rubeish disappears and the Doctor uses the data he has gathered to pilot the TARDIS back to the Middle Ages, not realising that Sarah has stowed away on board.

Sarah is captured and brought before Irongron, along with an archer, Hal, who has been sent to kill Irongron. The Doctor sets Hal and Sarah free and they head for Wessex Castle.

The next morning Irongron and his troops assault the castle using rifles supplied by Linx, but the attack is repelled by the Doctor's cunning. The failure further sours the relationship between Linx and Irongron.

The Doctor decides to lead an attack on Irongron's castle. He makes contact with Rubeish and finds the human scientists in a state of extreme exhaustion. Linx catches the Doctor in the laboratory once more, but this time is rendered immobile when, with the Doctor's guidance, a strike from Rubeish hits his probic vent – a Sontaran refuelling point on the back of their necks which is also their main weakness. Rubeish and the Doctor send the scientists back to the 20th century. Sarah now invites herself into Irongron's kitchen, using the opportunity to drug the food, thereby knocking out Irongron's men.

Linx determines his ship is repaired enough to effect a departure. A crazed and half drugged Irongron arrives and accuses Linx of betraying him; the Sontaran responds by killing him and is in turn shot by Hal. Linx falls dead over his controls, triggering the launch mechanism. Knowing the place is about to explode when the shuttle takes off, Hal awakes Bloodaxe, who rouses the remaining men and tells them to flee, while the Doctor hurries the last of his allies out of the castle. It explodes moments before the Doctor and Sarah depart in the TARDIS.

== Production ==
The story introduces a new "time tunnel" title sequence designed by Bernard Lodge

Working titles for this story included The Time Fugitive and The Time Survivor. The original outline for the serial was humorously submitted to the production office in the form of a "Field report from Sontaran Field Marshal Hol Mes, to Terran Cedicks".

Location shooting of both Wessex Castle and Irongron's castle was done at Peckforton Castle, in Cheshire, utilising different views.

The serial also stars Kevin Lindsay as Commander Linx. Lindsay reappeared as Cho-je in Jon Pertwee's last episode, Planet of the Spiders, and again as two Sontarans in Tom Baker's third story The Sontaran Experiment.

The story opens season 11 with a new title sequence, again designed by Bernard Lodge. For The Time Warrior, Lodge replaced the kaleidoscopic titles that had been introduced in 1970 for Spearhead from Space. Lodge had been inspired by the Stargate sequence developed by Douglas Trumbull for Stanley Kubrick's 1968 film 2001: A Space Odyssey, and worked with slit-scan photography techniques, abandoning the "howlaround" video technique that had been in use since the inception of Doctor Who. The result was a "time tunnel" effect, over which appeared in succession a full-length still image of Pertwee's Doctor and a new diamond-shaped programme logo, accompanied Delia Derbyshire's theme music. The titles were completed in August 1969, a month before work began on the serial. This "time tunnel" title sequence was subsequently adapted for season 12 with the casting of Tom Baker as the Doctor, and remained in use until 1980s.

This is the first story in the series history to refer to each segment as a 'Part' rather than 'Episode'. This remained until the end of the classic series with the exception of Destiny of the Daleks.

== Broadcast and reception ==
Episode	Title	Run time	Original release date	UK viewers (millions)	Archive
1	"Part One"	24:15	15 December 1973	8.7	PAL 2" colour videotape
2	"Part Two"	24:10	22 December 1973	7.0	PAL 2" colour videotape
3	"Part Three"	23:30	29 December 1973	6.6	PAL 2" colour videotape
4	"Part Four"	24:57	5 January 1974	10.6	PAL 2" colour videotape

Exterior scenes were filmed at Peckforton Castle in Cheshire,

The BBC Audience Research Report taken for the fourth episode was positive, particularly the climax. However, there was a minority that felt it was too far-fetched or slapstick.

In The Discontinuity Guide (1995), Paul Cornell, Martin Day, and Keith Topping wrote that the story was "a rather wonderful romp" and "one of Robert Holmes' funniest". David J. Howe and Stephen James Walker in The Television Companion (1998) gave a mixed review, stating that it was "enjoyable", especially in its dialogue and characters, but "lacks the sort of impact ideally needed to launch a new run of adventures". They felt that it was "absurd" for scientists to be under custody by UNIT, that the scientists were "clichéd and unbelievable", and the setting had "a lack of convincing period atmosphere". In 2010, Patrick Mulkern of Radio Times awarded it four stars out of five, praising the "broad characters and ripe dialogue", but felt the "greatest success" was Linx.

The A.V. Club's Christopher Bahn praised the characterisation of Linx and Sarah. DVD Talk's Stuart Galbraith gave The Time Warrior four out of five stars, highlighting the "clever writing" and actor David Daker's performance. In 2009, SFX listed the cliffhanger where Linx removes his helmet as the seventh scariest Doctor Who moment, praising the monster design and idea. In the book Doctor Who: The Episode Guide, Mark Campbell awarded it eight out of ten, concluding the serial was "a clever hybrid of history and science fiction. Linx is a chilling creation and, despite the hammy acting, there are some great moments."

== Commercial releases ==
=== In print ===
Doctor Who and the Time Warrior
- Author: Terrance Dicks and Robert Holmes (uncredited)
- Cover artist: Roy Knipe
- Series: Doctor Who book: Target novelisations
- Release number: 65
- Publisher: Target Books
- Publication date: 29 June 1978
- ISBN: 0-426-20023-3

A novelisation of this serial, written by Terrance Dicks, was published by Target Books in June 1978.

The Target novelisation, Doctor Who and the Time Warrior, features a prologue written by Robert Holmes involving Linx at war with a group of Rutan Fighters. He is given the first name of Jingo. The Sontaran home planet is named Sontara. It also suggests that the Earth had never been surveyed, which would eventually happen in the following Sontaran story The Sontaran Experiment.

Holmes was initially commissioned to novelise his own story, but wrote only the book's prologue, sending it to Dicks with a note telling him to finish the rest himself. Holmes was not credited for his contribution. An unabridged reading of the Target novel was released by BBC audio on CD in February 2009. It is read by Jeremy Bulloch who played Hal the archer in the TV story.

=== Home media ===
In 1989, the story was released in an omnibus format on VHS. This version omits a slightly extended scene of Sarah's capture from the beginning of episode two. The Time Warrior was released on region 2 DVD on 3 September 2007, commercially available in its original episodic format for the first time and on 1 April 2008 in Region 1 territories. It was also released as part of the Bred for War DVD boxset along stories The Sontaran Experiment, The Invasion of Time and The Two Doctors. This serial was also released as part of the Doctor Who DVD Files in issue 53 on 12 January 2011.

Along with a few other selected serials of the Second and Third Doctor's runs, this serial has been offered for sale on the iTunes Store as of August 2008.
