= The Ark in Space =

076 – The Ark in Space
- Doctor Who serial
- Noah (Kenton Moore) is infected by the alien Wirrn. Retrospectively, the use of bubble wrap to depict the infection has been criticised but Moore's performance is consistently praised.

Cast
- Doctor: Tom Baker – Fourth Doctor
- Companions: Elisabeth Sladen – Sarah Jane Smith; Ian Marter – Harry Sullivan
- Others: Kenton Moore – Noah; Wendy Williams – Vira; Richardson Morgan – Rogin; John Gregg – Lycett; Christopher Masters – Libri; Stuart Fell, Nick Hobbs – The Wirrn; Gladys Spencer – High Minister's Voice; Peter Tuddenham – Voices

Production
- Directed by: Rodney Bennett
- Written by: Robert Holmes; John Lucarotti (uncredited)
- Produced by: Philip Hinchcliffe
- Music by: Dudley Simpson
- Production code: 4C
- Series: Season 12
- Running time: 4 episodes, 25 minutes each
- First broadcast: 25 January 1975
- Last broadcast: 15 February 1975

Chronology
| ← Preceded by Robot | Followed by → The Sontaran Experiment |

The Ark in Space is the second serial of the twelfth season of the British science fiction television series Doctor Who. Written by Robert Holmes and directed by Rodney Bennett, it was first broadcast in four weekly parts from 25 January to 15 February 1975 on BBC1.

In the serial, the Doctor (Tom Baker) and his companions Sarah Jane Smith (Elisabeth Sladen) and Harry Sullivan (Ian Marter) arrive on a space station in the distant future. The insectoid aliens the Wirrn intend to absorb the humans along with their knowledge on board Space Station Nerva.

== Plot ==
The TARDIS materialises on a seemingly empty space station. While the Doctor (Tom Baker) and Harry Sullivan (Ian Marter) explore, Sarah Jane Smith (Elisabeth Sladen) is automatically placed into cryogenic suspension by the station's computer. The Doctor and Harry discover the station is an "ark" carrying the station's crew and passengers in suspended animation. Harry discovers Sarah as well as a mummified human-sized insect.

Crew members Vira, Sarah and Noah are revived. The Doctor tells Vira that Nerva's inhabitants have overslept by several millennia, thanks to the insect visitor that sabotaged the control systems. Noah and the visitors clash, and Noah accuses them of murdering a missing crewmate.

Noah investigates the power room and is infected by an alien creature. The Doctor realises the alien insect laid eggs inside the missing crewman, who became an alien now inhabiting Nerva. Noah kills a crewmate, but recovers enough to order Vira to revive the remaining crew and evacuate, but the Doctor realises the alien pupae will mature too quickly for this. He proposes that they destroy the Wirrn while they are in their dormant, pupal stage.

Dissection of the Wirrn corpse reveals the Wirrn are vulnerable to electricity. As he tries to reactivate the station power, the fully transformed Noah attacks him. Noah reveals that the Wirrn were driven from their home by human settlers and now intend to absorb all human knowledge.

The Doctor plans to electrify the cryogenic chamber to prevent the Wirrn from attacking more of the human crew. Because the Wirrn have disabled the station's power supply, the crew decide to use the generators on board a transport ship docked at the space station. Sarah volunteers to crawl through a narrow conduit carrying the power cable from the ship, and the Doctor succeeds in electrifying the cryogenic chamber. Set back, Noah, as the Swarm Leader, offers the others safe passage from Nerva if they leave the sleeping crew for the Wirrn, but the crew declines.

Noah leads the entire swarm in an assault on the transport ship. Vira and the rest of the crew escape the transport ship after setting the autopilot. The transport blasts off carrying the entire swarm away from the station. The Doctor wonders whether this was Noah's plan all along, to save Nerva, and that there was some spark of humanity left in him. Noah transmits one final good-bye to Vira before the transport explodes with the entire Wirrn swarm on board.

In the closing sequence, the TARDIS party teleport down to Earth to repair the receiver terminal and allow the ark colonists to repopulate the Earth.

== Production ==
The script, written by Robert Holmes, is from a story by John Lucarotti, which was rewritten because it was considered unusable. Holmes rewrote The Ark in Space as a four-part serial as a lead-in to the two-part The Sontaran Experiment. Lucarotti does not receive any on-screen credit. Barry Letts had planned the story, originally called Space Station, before Philip Hinchcliffe took over as producer. Letts had also planned to produce the four-part serial alongside the two-part Sontaran Experiment, so it was treated as a single six-part story to save money; The Ark in Space was filmed entirely in-studio, while The Sontaran Experiment was filmed entirely on location.

The Ark in Space is the first broadcast story from Hinchcliffe as producer. Hinchcliffe believed that in order to expand the show's core audience, it was necessary to broaden the show's appeal to adults, and Ark in Space demonstrates this with its use of horror, particularly the inexorable transformation of Noah into an alien creature. A scene in which the half-transformed Noah begs Vira to kill him was deemed too scary for children and had to be cut.

The title sequence for Part One was tinted green as an experiment but was not repeated for subsequent episodes. The title sequence would stay constant for the next six years.

The Ark in Space was recorded in-studio in October and November 1974. The sets for this story were re-used for Revenge of the Cybermen, partially set on Space Station Nerva at an earlier time.

== Broadcast and reception ==
| Episode | Title | Run time | Original release date | UK viewers (millions) |
|---|---|---|---|---|
| 1 | "Part One" | 24:58 | 25 January 1975 | 9.4 |
| 2 | "Part Two" | 24:49 | 1 February 1975 | 13.6 |
| 3 | "Part Three" | 24:05 | 8 February 1975 | 11.2 |
| 4 | "Part Four" | 24:37 | 15 February 1975 | 10.2 |

Part Two of this story charted at number five for the most-watched television programmes across the week on all channels. This was the highest chart placing ever attained by a single episode of Doctor Who until 2007's "Voyage of the Damned" placed second for both that week and the entire year. The highest rated episode (in terms of viewing audience) is Part Four of City of Death. The story was edited and condensed into a single omnibus edition, broadcast at 6:35 pm on 20 August 1975 and reached 8.2 million viewers. The compilation was included on the Special Edition DVD release of the story.

Paul Cornell, Martin Day, and Keith Topping gave the serial a favourable review in The Discontinuity Guide (1995), writing, "The Ark in Space rises above the dodginess of the effects by treating its themes so seriously it's a possible influence on Alien (1979)". This was a view echoed by Steven Moffat prior to the broadcast of the 2014 Doctor Who Christmas Special; replying to a question on borrowing material from the Alien films, he countered with "they never asked Doctor Who to borrow the plot of The Ark in Space". In The Television Companion (1998), David J. Howe and Stephen James Walker wrote that the story "contains some of the most horrific material to have been featured in the series up to this point". They praised the set design and the dramatic tension, as well as the effects of the Wirrn. In 2010, Patrick Mulkern of Radio Times was positive towards the series' turn towards horror, writing that the poor effects were successful in conveying what they intended. Mulkern also praised the cast. DVD Talk's J Doyle Wallis gave the serial three and a half out of five stars, calling it "a neat little slice of science fiction adventure". Reviewing the 2013 rerelease for the same site, Ian Jane gave it four stars, saying that it was "a lot of fun" despite the production values being a "mixed bag". Will Salmon of SFX rated the serial four and a half out of five stars, calling it "brimming with confidence". Salmon wrote that the concept of the Wirrn were so terrifying that the poor effects did not matter.

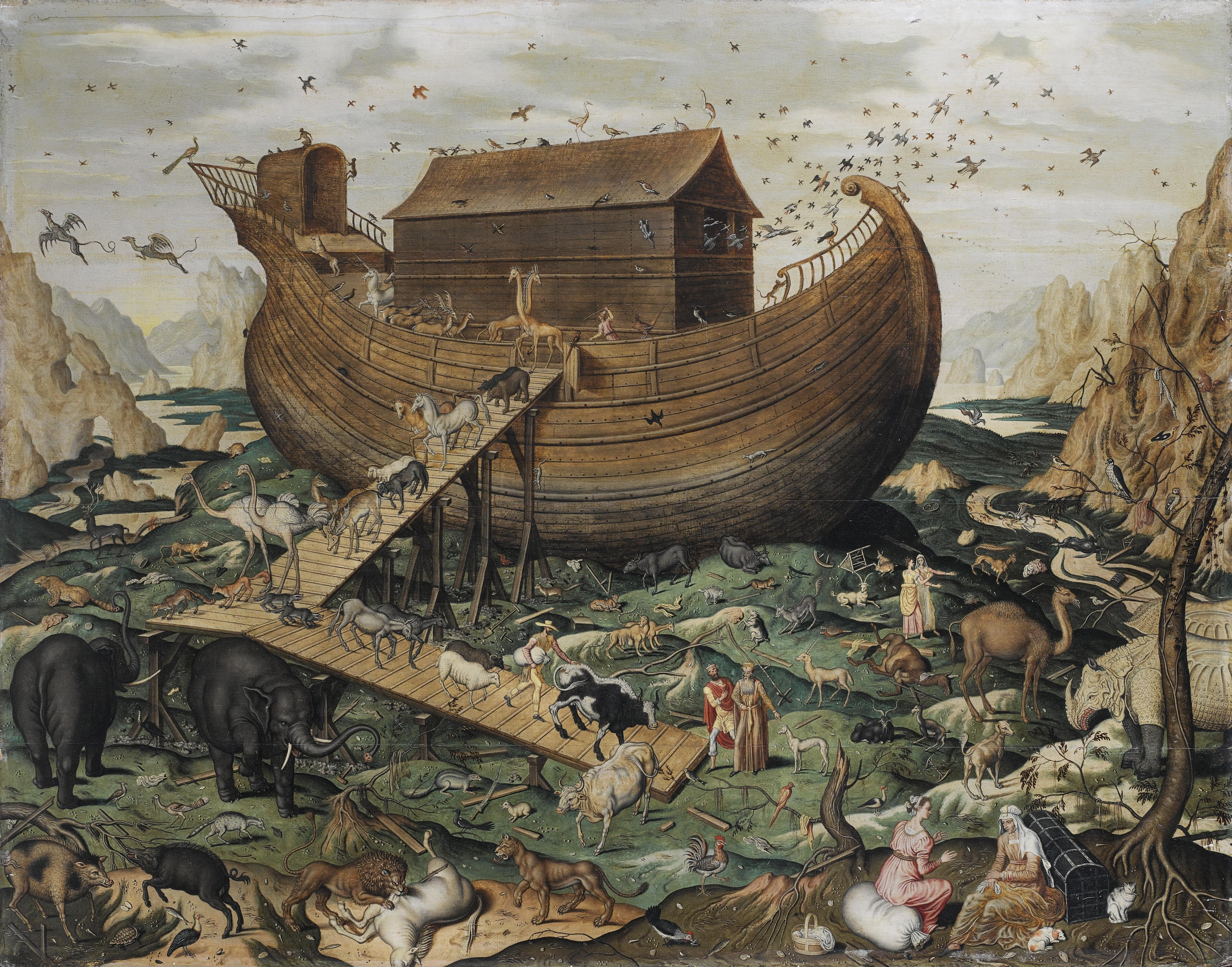
The Ark in Space is considered to have drawn explicitly on the Biblical story of Noah's Ark.

In an analysis of apocalyptic themes in Doctor Who, academic Andrew Crome highlighted the explicit religious influences on the writing of The Ark in Space. He considered the eponymous Ark to be an analogue of the Biblical story of Noah's Ark, the ancient flood myth related in the Book of Genesis, and that the naming of the Nerva Beacon commander as Noah was an overtly Biblical allusion. Crome also drew parallels between the commandment given by God to Man in Genesis 1:28 — "Be fruitful, and multiply, and replenish the earth" — and the High Minister's rousing speech to the humans awakening from cryogenic sleep on Nerva Beacon:

You will return to an Earth purified by flame... If it be arid, you must make it flourish, if it be stony, you must make it fertile.

According to Crome, the catastrophe of solar flares burning the Earth was represented in the Ark in Space as a purifying event which led to the renewal of human society, drawing heavily on the Genesis flood narrative.

Russell T Davies and Steven Moffat, showrunners of Doctor Who's revived series, have both named The Ark in Space as their favourite story from the classic series. The Ark in Space was placed in 28th position in Doctor Who Magazine's Mighty 200 reader survey in 2009, which ranked every Doctor Who serial to that point in order of preference.

== Commercial releases ==
=== In print ===
Doctor Who and the Ark in Space
- Author: Ian Marter
- Cover artist: Chris Achilleos
- Series: Doctor Who book: Target novelisations
- Release number: 4
- Publisher: Target Books
- Publication date: 10 May 1977
- ISBN: 0-426-11631-3

A novelisation of this serial, written by Ian Marter, was published by Target Books in 1977. It was subsequently reprinted by Virgin Publishing in 1991 with a new cover. BBC Books also reprinted the book in 2012 in an edition featuring an introduction by Steven Moffat. This was Marter's first novelisation for Target; he would go on to write seven more. Marter had wanted to correct some logical problems he had found in the story. He considered writing in first person from Harry's point of view, but abandoned this when he realised that many important plot points took place when Harry was not present. Notably, Marter changed the spelling of "Wirrn" to "Wirrrn". Marter alters the ending so that the travellers leave in the TARDIS.

=== Home media ===
The Ark in Space was first released on VHS in 1989 in an omnibus format. It was then re-released in 1994 in its original episodic format (but the 1999 US release is still in omnibus format). It was released on Laserdisc in 1996 in its original episodic format. It was released on DVD in the United Kingdom on 8 April 2002. It was released for sale on iTunes on 11 August 2008. This serial was also released as part of the Doctor Who DVD Files in Issue 90 on 13 June 2012. The Ark in Space was released as a special edition DVD on 25 February 2013.
