= The Sontaran Experiment =

077 – The Sontaran Experiment
- Doctor Who serial

Cast
- Doctor: Tom Baker – Fourth Doctor
- Companions: Elisabeth Sladen – Sarah Jane Smith; Ian Marter – Harry Sullivan
- Others: Kevin Lindsay – Styre / The Marshal; Donald Douglas – Vural; Glyn Jones – Krans; Peter Walshe – Erak; Peter Rutherford – Roth; Terry Walsh – Zake; Brian Ellis – Prisoner

Production
- Directed by: Rodney Bennett
- Written by: Bob Baker; Dave Martin
- Script editor: Robert Holmes
- Produced by: Philip Hinchcliffe
- Music by: Dudley Simpson
- Production code: 4B
- Series: Season 12
- Running time: 2 episodes, 25 minutes each
- First broadcast: 22 February 1975
- Last broadcast: 1 March 1975

Chronology
← Preceded by The Ark in Space	Followed by → Genesis of the Daleks

The Sontaran Experiment is the third serial of the 12th season of the British science fiction television series Doctor Who, which was originally broadcast on BBC1 on 22 February and 1 March 1975.

The serial is set on Earth more than 10,000 years in the future, immediately after the events of The Ark in Space. In the serial, the Sontaran Field Major Styre (Kevin Lindsay) performs experiments on humans he trapped there as part of the Sontarans' invasion stratagem.

== Plot ==
Following on from The Ark in Space, the Fourth Doctor, Sarah Jane Smith, and Harry Sullivan teleport down from the Nerva space station to Earth, ostensibly uninhabited. However, the system is not functioning well, and the Doctor begins repairing it. The other two explore the surrounding area, but Harry falls down a crevasse and Sarah goes to seek the Doctor's help. He is nowhere in sight.

Roth, an astronaut, finds Sarah. He is obviously distressed, and explains that he has been tortured by an alien that lives in the rocks, together with its patrolling robot. He takes Sarah towards the astronauts' campsite, but refuses to approach it, suspecting the astronaut Vural of collusion with the alien.

Three of the astronauts have captured the Doctor. They believe Nerva to be a legend, and tell him in turn that they had picked up a distress signal from Earth. They came to investigate, but their ship was vapourised when they emerged, leaving nine of them stranded. Then they began to vanish one by one. They blame the Doctor for this. Roth appears and the astronauts chase him, while Sarah frees the Doctor. Roth loses the others and meets up with Sarah and the Doctor. The Doctor also falls down a crevasse, and the robot returns, capturing Roth and Sarah and bringing them to the alien's spacecraft. The alien is Field Major Styre of the Sontaran G3 Military Assessment Survey, who has been experimenting on, and killing, the astronauts. Roth tries to escape but is shot dead by Styre.

Styre reports back to his Marshal via a video link. The Marshal is impatient for the intelligence report (without which an invasion of Earth cannot take place), but Styre admits that he has been delayed in his experiments.

Styre subjects Sarah to a series of terrifying hallucinations. The Doctor, free from the hole, has reached her and rips off a hallucinogenic device from her forehead, but she falls unconscious. The Doctor, enraged, attacks Styre, but the Sontaran easily fends him off. Styre shoots him unconscious (believing it to be fatal) when he runs away.

The robot, having captured the three remaining spacemen, brings them to Styre's ship, where it is revealed that Vural had tried to make a deal with Styre in exchange for his own life. However, Styre intends to experiment on Vural anyway. The Doctor recovers, disables the robot, and meets Sarah and Harry. He confronts Styre, goading him into a hand-to-hand combat. While they fight, Sarah and Harry free the astronauts, and then Harry climbs towards Styre's ship to sabotage it. Styre almost wins the fight, but Vural attacks him, saving the Doctor at the cost of his own life. Styre, now low on energy, heads back towards his ship to recharge, but the sabotage causes it to kill him.

The Doctor informs the Marshal that not only has Styre's mission failed, but that the invasion plans are in human hands. This is enough to ward off the invasion, and the three companions attempt to return to Nerva.

== Production ==
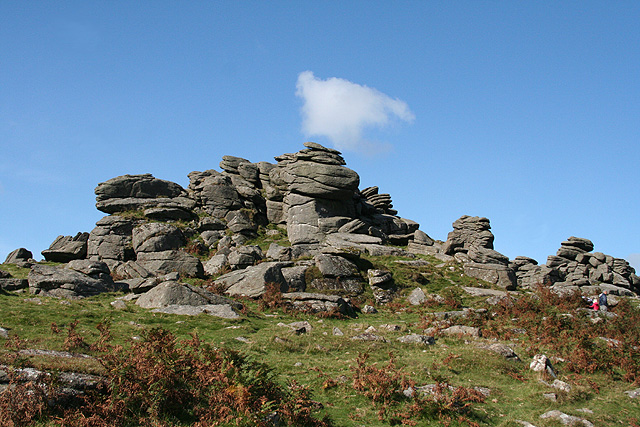
Hound Tor on Dartmoor was used for location filming

Working titles for this story included The Destructors. These two episodes were initially part of a six-episode arc, but Philip Hinchcliffe made the decision to split the arc into the four-part Ark in Space and this two-part story, sharing the same director and budget. To save money, Hinchcliffe decided that Ark would be entirely recorded in the studio and this story would be entirely recorded on location. He also settled on the Sontarans because they could re-use the Sontaran costume from The Time Warrior and therefore save the expense of designing a new alien. This was the first two-part serial to be broadcast since 1965's The Rescue and the last until 1982's Black Orchid.

Although the serial was the third to feature Baker, it was actually the second shot, hence the out-of-sequence production code. This was only the second serial in the history of Doctor Who (the first being 1970's Spearhead from Space) to be shot entirely on location, in this case at Hound Tor on Dartmoor. However, unlike Spearhead from Space and the location material for other serials, the production was mounted entirely on videotape using early portable video equipment, rather than on the usual 16mm film. This use of location video was remarkable for the time, but technical problems are evident in the final programmes. This was also the first and only Doctor Who story where there were no interior scenes at all. During shooting, Baker broke his collarbone. However, because part of his costume was a large scarf, he could conceal the neck brace he had to wear following the injury. For action scenes, he was doubled by regular stunt performer Terry Walsh, shot from several face-concealing angles. The recording of both episodes was completed in a week.

=== Cast notes ===
Glyn Jones, who played the astronaut Krans, wrote the First Doctor serial The Space Museum (1965); he was the only person both to act and write for Doctor Who during its original 1963-89 run. The Sontaran Experiment contains the last major role played by Kevin Lindsay before his death in 1975 of a heart condition, only eight weeks after the broadcast. He found the heavy Sontaran costume so difficult to manage that he could not leave the Hound Tor location for breaks, and also could not perform the fight scene – a stand-in, Stuart Fell, was used instead. Terry Walsh not only played a minor role as an astronaut, but doubled for Tom Baker in parts of episode two, after Baker broke a collarbone during filming. This meant that the climactic fight was performed by two stand-ins rather than the original actors. Most of the actors playing the GalSec astronauts were South African. This was specified in the casting, as the writers, Bob Baker and Dave Martin, were interested in language change and reasoned that the multi-linguistic influences on South African English might resemble future developments of the English language.

== Broadcast and reception ==
Episode	Title	Run time	Original release date	UK viewers (millions)
1	"Part One"	24:27	22 February 1975	11
2	"Part Two"	25:00	1 March 1975	10.5

The two episodes were combined into a single 50 minute omnibus broadcast on BBC1 at 6:25 pm on 9 July 1976 and was seen by 8.2 million viewers. The story received criticism from Mary Whitehouse (of the National Viewers' and Listeners' Association) for its depiction of "helpless adults in a state of terror".

Paul Cornell, Martin Day, and Keith Topping wrote in The Discontinuity Guide (1995) that the serial "succeeds despite its obvious limitations". They praised the look of the all-video location recording, but commented that "neither the robot nor the deflection of the Marshal's invasion plans are wholly convincing". In The Television Companion (1998), David J. Howe and Stephen James Walker said that the premise of a Sontaran surveying humans before conquering the Earth was "silly", but they praised the "atmosphere and imagery" achieved with tension, location filming, and direction. In 2010, Patrick Mulkern of Radio Times described The Sontaran Experiment as "short, taut and sadistic" and wrote that "impetus and panache prevail over problems with plot logic". DVD Talk's Stuart Galbraith gave the serial three and half out of five stars, writing that its "best assets are its appropriately confined telling".

== Commercial releases ==
=== In print ===
Doctor Who and the Sontaran Experiment
- Author: Ian Marter
- Cover artist: Roy Knipe
- Series: Doctor Who book: Target novelisations
- Release number: 56
- Publisher: Target Books
- Publication date: 7 December 1978
- ISBN: 0-426-20049-7

A novelisation of this serial was written by Ian Marter, who appeared in the serial as the Doctor's companion Harry. It was published by Target Books in November 1978. The novelisation differs from the TV version by having the travellers arrive in the TARDIS. The Sontaran plan here does not involve war with the Rutans but a planned conquest in alliance with another clone species.

=== Home media ===
The Sontaran Experiment was released on VHS in October 1991 as a double video with Genesis of the Daleks. In October 2006, it was released on DVD on its own and then two years later as part of the Bred for War box set, along with The Time Warrior, The Invasion of Time and The Two Doctors.
