= Bernard Lodge =

British graphic designer (born 1933)

- Born: 1933 (age 92–93)
- Education: Royal College of Arts
- Known for: Motion graphics
- Notable work: Title sequence design for Doctor Who
- Website: www.bernardlodge.co.uk

Bernard Lodge (born 1933) is a British graphic designer, known for his design of title sequences for television programmes. He worked for the BBC from 1959 to 1977 before launching a freelance career. He has been described by the Open University as a pioneer of graphic design in television.

== Career ==
External videos
- Video: Doctor Who Title Sequences 1963 - 2025 (BBC) - A compilation of Doctor Who title sequences, including Lodge's work to 1980

Lodge attended the Royal College of Art and joined the BBC graphics department. He is known for his work on the science-fiction television series Doctor Who, for which he designed the first four series logos and engineered the first five title sequences. The earliest versions were generated using the 'howlround' technique. Lodge began to experiment with slit-scan photography techniques that has been developed by Douglas Trumbull to generate the Stargate sequence in Stanley Kubrick's 1968 film 2001: A Space Odyssey. In 1973, he used this technique to generate a new title sequence for Doctor Who, creating a "time tunnel" effect. Lodge's designs were used on Doctor Who until 1980, when Sid Sutton was appointed as the designer of a new title sequence by incoming producer John Nathan-Turner.

After leaving the BBC, Lodge worked on films, including Ridley Scott's Alien and Blade Runner.

Since retiring, Lodge has written and illustrated children’s books, and works in woodcut and linocut printmaking.

== Awards ==
Several of Lodge's title designs in the 1960s and 1970s won awards from Design and Art Direction. In 1974, Lodge won a Royal Television Society Award for Best Graphics, becoming one of the first people involved in Doctor Who to win an award for his work.

== Filmography ==
Lodge designed title sequences for a range of noted productions:

Television titles
Year	Title	Notes
1961	Picture Parade	
1961	Wednesday Magazine	
1961	Walk a Crooked Mile	
1962	The Net	
1963	Teletale	
1963	Festival	
1963	Doctor Who	revisions in 1967, 1970, 1973 and 1974
1964	Detective	
1964	Catch Hand	
1964	The Master of Santiago	
1965	Tea Party	
1965	Out of the Unknown	
1965	Man Alive	
1966	The Late Show	
1966	Freewheel	
1966	Francis Durbridge Presents - Bat Out of Hell	
1966	Adam Adamant Lives!	
1966	24 Hours	
1968	Panorama	
1968	The Tennis Elbow Foot Game	
1972	The Commanders	
1972	The Man Who Was Hunting Himself	
1973	Password	
1982	Sportsnight	
1975	Ten From the Twenties	
1975	On the Move	
1975	North and South	
1975	I Didn't Know You Cared	
1975	Wessex Tales	
1975	The Love School	
1976	Playhouse - The Mind Beyond	
1977	Marie Curie	
1977	The World About Us	

Film
Date	Title	Notes
1979	Alien	Visual effects
1982	Blade Runner	Visual effects
