= Doctor Who fandom =

Fan base of television series Doctor Who

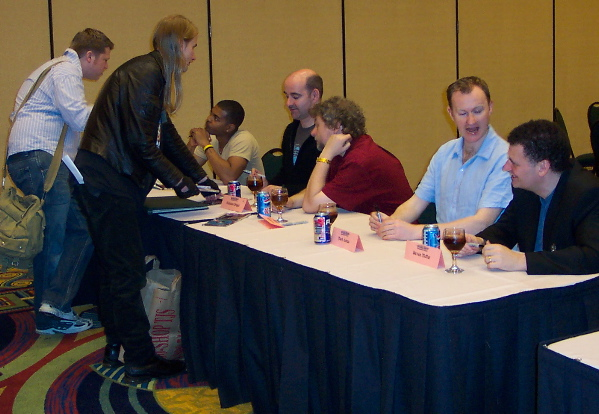
Fans line up for autographs at the 2006 Gallifrey One convention. Guests, left to right at table: Noel Clarke, Nicholas Briggs, Rob Shearman, Mark Gatiss and Steven Moffat.

The Doctor Who fandom (also known as Whovians) is an international and informal community drawn together by long-running British science fiction television series Doctor Who . The fandom works through the use of many different forms of media, including fan clubs, fan film, websites, cosplay and conventions.

== Fan organisations ==
Doctor Who fans in Britain have had a formally recognised organisation – the Doctor Who Appreciation Society (or DWAS) – since the late 1970s. It has thousands of members and enjoyed an ongoing relationship with the classic series, and later with BBC Worldwide.

The Oceanian Doctor Who Fan Club was founded soon after DWAS, in 1976, to galvanise resistance to the responsibilities and decisions of the Australian Broadcasting Commission to cease broadcasting the Doctor Who series (and was ultimately successful in having the decision overturned). The club president also edited Zerinza, the club fanzine, until 1986. In the 1990s the club was renamed several times, today being the Doctor Who Club of Australia (or DWCA) which publishes a newsletter, "Data Extract".

In the 1980s, some US fans staged "Save Doctor Who" publicity campaigns, trying to urge their local television stations to keep airing the show.

The North American Doctor Who Appreciation Society was founded in the 1980s and served as an umbrella organisation for dozens of local fan groups throughout the continent. Its demise in the early 1980s led to the foundation of the Doctor Who Fan Club of America, and later the Friends of Doctor Who. FDW ended unceremoniously in the mid-1990s, and since then, American Doctor Who fandom has been served mostly through local fan clubs.

The Doctor Who Information Network (DWIN) was founded in Canada in 1980 and continues to serve fans in North America. DWIN supports the monthly Toronto Tavern fan gatherings. DWIN also sponsored several local chapters throughout Canada.

Also in Canada is the Doctor Who Society of Canada (DWSC). The DWSC launched in 2011 and provides monthly social gatherings, as well as its own Doctor Who Festival in 2012 called REGENERATION.

The New Zealand Doctor Who Fan Club (NZDWFC) was founded by Scott Walker and Andrew Poulson in 1988. The club puts out a fanzine, Time Space Visualiser (TSV), twice-yearly.

In 2012, The Doctor Who Fan Groups Google Map project was set up with the aim of making it easier for UK-based Doctor Who fans to find a local fan group and, in turn, help local fan groups find new members.

== Conventions ==
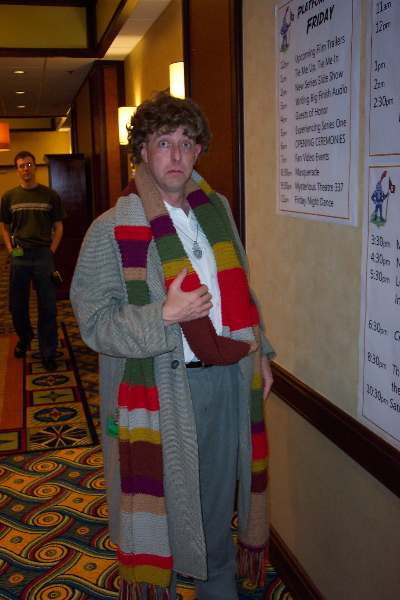
At Doctor Who conventions, some fans cosplay as their favourite Doctor Who characters. Here, a fan at the 2006 Gallifrey One convention cosplays as the Fourth Doctor.

Many Doctor Who conventions are held worldwide. The first one in 1977 was organised by the Doctor Who Appreciation Society and continued in the UK as the long running PANOPTICON. Other past conventions include the Manchester-based Manopticon and Swindon-based Leisure Hives and Honeycomb. More recently, the company 10th Planet has held conventions such as Bad Wolf, Dimensions, and Invasion. There was also Regenerations in Wales, and other signing events held on the Strand by London-based Scificollector.

In Australia, a variety of events have been organised, many "Whoventions" being held in Sydney by the Doctor Who Club of Australia, and by some other clubs in various states. Many events have been organised at short notice during any visits by a star, or other person linked to the show, such as Jon Pertwee (1980), Peter Davison and Janet Fielding (both 1983).

North America's first events were based in Los Angeles in 1979 and 1980 with Who One featuring Tom Baker. Soon followed an enormous convention heyday during the 1980s in the Chicago area with the Spirit of Light events, which attracted many thousands of fans due to the show's popularity on public television, and Creation Conventions held in various cities. In the late 1980s, other events such as Omnicon and Megacon showcased the classic series. The 1990s saw a decline in major events, though Chicago featured the relatively large-sized Visions events throughout the decade, and the popular Gallifrey One convention began in Los Angeles. As of 2015, Gallifrey One and the Chicago TARDIS convention continue, with the addition of Georgia's WHOlanta in Atlanta, Florida's Hurricane Who, Alabama's Con Kasterborous, New York's L. I. Who, and the annual Sci Fi Sea Cruise featuring Doctor Who guests departing from different ports each year. Startup events exist in the form of CONsole Room in Minnesota, (Re)Generation Who in Maryland, Time Eddy in Kansas, and WhoFest in Texas.

== Fanzines ==
Doctor Who fanzines began to be published in the UK in the 1970s. Much of the content of the first fanzines was devoted to documenting plots and characters, interviews, news, book reviews, letters, fan fiction and art. One of the first was hand-produced and published by Keith Miller in Edinburgh, but by the mid-1970s fanzine-creators switched to photocopying; however, output faded in the following years.

The "second generation" of such fanzines began around 1975–76, such as TARDIS, around which the DWAS was organised. In Australia, the national Doctor Who Club was similarly established around the 'zine Zerinza in 1976 (to 1986). A quarterly magazine called The Whostorian was published in Newfoundland in conjunction with the As Yet Unnamed Doctor Who Fan Club of Newfoundland (AYUDWFCON). Other zines from the first decade of fandom included Gallifrey, Oracle, Skaro, Shada and Frontier Worlds. Information on some of these is documented at fan website Ninth Circle of Hell.

The growth of the merchandise range lead to Marvel's Doctor Who Weekly (later Doctor Who Magazine – DWM). Initially the reference materials were largely reissues of the work done by Jeremy Bentham for DWAS (itself usually reliant on BBC plot outlines). Initially it was considered poor quality compared to the DWAS due to it being dominated by American-style comics, which did not fit with the style of the series. It rivalled the DWAS after it switched to a monthly format with a higher-budget production. The DWM became a better source of reference, with regular interviews and news from the studio. Over time, fanzine editors began to concentrate more on opinion than reference, for example by featuring fan reviews of stories and the letters page, which was the main conduit for debate pre-internet. The need to find new, original content meant that fanzines began to look closer at the series, subjecting stories and characters to ever-deeper analysis, providing detail and discussion unavailable through more "official" channels.

As technology developed, so did fanzines. A move from photocopying to offset litho printing in the early 1980s allowed the bigger selling fanzines to improve print quality, although lower-circulation titles continued to use photocopying for many years after this. Bath-based Skaro was one of the first fanzines to be professionally typeset, but that was the exception as this was such an expensive process. The 1970s–80s fanzines were all produced well before widespread home computer and printer ownership, making the process long and difficult.

The mid-1980s has been described by some fans as "the golden age of A5 fanzines", as this period saw an explosion of activity, particularly in the UK. Although the enthusiasm of some editors could not be matched by their resources and many fanzines failed to see a second issue, some of the most popular zines appeared then, including Queen Bat, Chronicle, Star Begotten, Paradise Lost, Spectrox, Black and White Guardian, Cygnus Alpha, Five Hundred Eyes, Eye Of Horus (in print between 1983 and 1985 and online since 2004) and Purple Haze (edited by Steve O'Brien, later of SFX Magazine).

Format seemed to play a disproportionate role in how a fanzine was perceived, with divisions appearing between the cheaper-looking A5 fanzines and the glossier, more professional A4 "pro-zines" such as The Frame and Private Who. The news-zine Doctor Who Bulletin (DWB) (later named Dreamwatch Bulletin) managed to straddle this divide, sometimes controversially, combining a professional A4 magazine format with some of the anarchism and disrespect for authority of the underground. The BBC's discontinuation of the series, and ratings decline, meant that many titles faded out unless backed by a large club.

To a large extent, today fanzines have been replaced by websites, podcasts and discussion boards, but a few do still exist. Many of them are published by fan clubs including the DWAS zine Celestial Toyroom, (which was launched in 1976 and has been published continuously since then, making it the oldest surviving Doctor Who fanzine in the world, the New Zealand Doctor Who Fan Club zine Time-Space Visualiser (TSV) which has been in existence since 1987, the DWIN fanzine Enlightenment which has been published six times a year since 1983, and Data Extract launched by the Doctor Who Club of Australia in 1980. Other individuals and groups still produce fanzines. Black Scrolls was the first prozine to offer a multimedia CDROM on its cover in 2005, featuring interviews with actors, Who-related art, a back issue archive and an alternative voice-over commentary for one of the episodes and the distinction of being professionally printed and entirely in colour which was a modest success that ran for eight issues between 1993 and 2005. Doctor Who Fanzines FANWNAK and Vworp! Vworp! are among the full colour A4, printed fanzines available today, as well as others such as Panic Moon, The Finished Product which are smaller sizes and black and white. Many fanzines still take the time-honoured route of printing and distributing their zine by mail, but many now distribute their fanzine as downloadable and printable PDFs such as Planet of the Ming Mongs and "The Terrible Zodin", finally removing what was often the main cause for a fanzine's closure, the cost of printing and distribution – but in so doing also losing the appeal of a unique hardcopy publication, and therefore the only true identifier of a 'fanzine'.

Many professional Doctor Who writers, for both the current TV series and the books, began their careers writing for fanzines, including Paul Cornell, Rob Shearman, Matt Jones, Marc Platt, Gareth Roberts, Clayton Hickman, David Howe and Stephen James Walker.

== Fan productions ==
Like other shows which have developed a large following, Doctor Who also has groups of fans developing their own productions based on the show, the most notable is the uncompleted 1996 Devious for having the last acting appearance of Jon Pertwee as the Third Doctor and featured as a special feature on The War Games DVD.

One of the most significant fan groups producing dramatised stories were Audio Visuals, who distributed their works on audio cassettes during the 1980s. Many involved in this group would later form the commercial company Big Finish Productions and be licensed by the BBC to produce official Doctor Who stories for a retail market on audio CD. Several of these productions were later broadcast by BBC Radio.

Another fan group, The Doctor Who Audio Dramas, has produced their own version of the show since 1982 and has been running for over 42 years uninterrupted. (Longer than the uninterrupted BBC version of Doctor Who.) A number of their writers and actors have been professionals or gone on to professional work.

Doctor Puppet is a series of US/UK stop-motion-animated fan films inspired by the BBC science fiction program Doctor Who. The series was created by Alisa Stern in 2012 in her New York apartment.

El Mundo Imperfecto is a film created in Barcelona in 2013, featuring various Doctors and companions meeting up in the real world, ahead of the 50th anniversary of the series.

=== Fan Stories ===
The Ten Doctors is a fan made comic that was made by Canadian artist Rich Morris from 2007 to 2009, featuring the first to ten incarnations of the Doctor on an adventure together.

=== The Unmade Season (2026) ===
In September 2026, during an official broadcasting hiatus for the television series, a 55-minute fan film titled The Unmade Season: The Curse of Kilmorag generated widespread media coverage and debate regarding the use of generative artificial intelligence (AI) in fan communities. Created by Scottish filmmaker Thomas Vittlowe, the project was generated using AI video-generation models (specifically LTX 2.5 and MiniMax) based on an original written script, financed independently and via Patreon alongside partial platform sponsorship. Reception among fans was divided; some praised Vittlowe's technical accomplishment whilst others criticised the work as "AI slop". The production reportedly cost around £50 per minute to generate and accumulated over 500,000 views before being temporarily taken down due to a copyright claim.

On 29 September 2026, at a Royal Television Society conference, BBC Director-General, Matt Brittin, described the series first episode as “pretty good” remarking that "everyone’s got the ability in their hands — or six billion people have — to create content at the standard of a Hollywood studio”. His comments prompted further backlash from segments of the fan base.

== Celebrity fans ==
Some fans have ended up working creatively on the television series. One of the most prominent examples is the creator of The Hitchhiker's Guide to the Galaxy, the late Douglas Adams, who wrote or co-wrote several television scripts (The Pirate Planet, City of Death and Shada) and was script editor of the original series' seventeenth season. Adams had been a fan since the first season, and made two attempts to pitch a script for Doctor Who in the early 1970s before his first serial was commissioned. Queer as Folk creator Russell T Davies, Coupling and Sherlock creator Steven Moffat, and Broadchurch creator Chris Chibnall were all lifelong fans of the series, and all in turn became head writer, or showrunner, of the revived series in 2005, 2010, and 2018 respectively. Chibnall's fandom extended to an appearance, as a representative of the Doctor Who Appreciation Society, on a 1986 episode of the BBC feedback show Open Air, in which he was critical of the ending to The Trial of a Time Lord, the 23rd season of Doctor Who.

Other celebrity fans have donated to the show in alternative ways. For example, the Panini publication The Complete Seventh Doctor (p47) lists singer Bob Dylan as a "great fan", such that he permitted his music to be used in the opening moments of season twenty-five without royalty. (Although Dylan's music was not in the event used). William Rees-Mogg, editor of The Times newspaper from 1967 until 1981, publicly declared his enjoyment of Doctor Who on an edition of the BBC's current affairs series Panorama in 1980. Prompted by this, the actor and dramatist Emlyn Williams admitted in the pages of The Times that he too was a keen follower of the series.

In 2013, King Charles III and Queen Camilla (the then Prince of Wales and Duchess of Cornwall, respectively) visited the Doctor Who set in Cardiff. Charles had met Eleventh Doctor actor Matt Smith and stated to him that he had been a big fan of the show since he was 15 in 1963.

=== List of celebrity fans ===
- Michael Chabon, novelist
- Benedict Cumberbatch, actor (his mother Wanda Ventham guest starred in the series on three occasions.)
- Philip DeFranco, Internet personality
- Robert Downey Jr., actor
- David Duchovny, actor
- Paul Draper, musician
- Ryan Gosling, actor and filmmaker
- Whoopi Goldberg, actress, comedian, and television personality
- Goldie Lookin Chain, band
- Tom Hanks, actor
- Paul Hartnoll, musician
- David Hewlett, actor
- Peter Jackson, director
- Rich Johnston, writer
- Meat Loaf, singer
- Eric McCormack, actor
- Grant Morrison, writer
- Gabe Newell, businessman
- Jey Parks, artist
- Ricky Norwood, actor
- Mark Ravenhill, playwright
- Rick Riordan, author
- Sheppard (band), band
- Patrick Stewart, actor
- Wil Wheaton actor
- Robert Pattinson, actor
- Edgar Wright, director
- Noah Wyle, actor

Additionally, the son of Rowan Williams (former Archbishop of Canterbury), is a fan and Williams invited Richard Dawkins to Lambeth Palace; in part because Dawkins's wife, Lalla Ward played the Fourth Doctor's companion, Romana.

=== List of celebrity fans who have appeared in episodes ===
- Kylie Minogue – "Voyage of the Damned" (2007)
- David Walliams – "The God Complex" (2011)
- Rufus Hound – "The Woman Who Lived" (2015)
- Corey Taylor – "Before the Flood" (2015)
- Stephen Fry – "Spyfall" (2020)

Notably, both David Tennant and Peter Capaldi have repeatedly said that they were inspired as children to become actors after watching the series, with their biggest dreams being to one day play the Doctor; Tennant would later be cast as the Tenth and Fourteenth in 2005 and 2022 respectively, while Capaldi took on the role of the Twelfth in 2014. Additionally, following his appearance in the series, Rufus Hound would be cast as an incarnation of the Meddling Monk in the Big Finish audio range.

== Music inspired by Doctor Who ==
Since the show's debut, various musical groups and artists have been inspired to write music either about or relating to Doctor Who. The first known example was the song "I'm Gonna Spend My Christmas With a Dalek", the first and only single released by British band The Go-Go's. The song was released in December 1964 and distributed through Oriole Records, but did not make the UK Singles Chart.

The first single about the show to make the UK Singles Chart was "Dr. Who" by Mankind. The track was based on the Doctor Who theme music in a disco style and was Mankind's first and only charting single(follow up 'Chain Reaction'was a flop). Released by Pinnacle in 1978, the song peaked at Number 25 in the UK Singles Chart.

In 1985, charity ensemble Who Cares? released a single protesting at the BBC's decision to place Doctor Who on hiatus for 18 months, entitled "Doctor in Distress". The single was released in aid of Cancer Research, and featured various Doctor Who cast members (such as Colin Baker, Nicola Bryant and Anthony Ainley), as well as contemporary musicians (Bucks Fizz, The Moody Blues and Ultravox). As with "I'm Gonna Spend My Christmas With a Dalek", the single did not make the UK Singles Chart.

The most famous example of Doctor Who-inspired music is "Doctorin' the Tardis" by The Timelords (a pseudonym for the ambient house and situationist act The KLF), which reached Number One on the UK Singles Chart in 1988. The song's lyrics referenced the Daleks and the TARDIS, and its melody was based largely around the show's opening theme.

As well as both Mankind and The Timelords, many other acts have incorporated the Doctor Who theme music into their own compositions. British rock band Pink Floyd briefly used the theme during their 1971 single "One of These Days", which featured a Doctor Who-related music video. The theme music has also been covered by several other acts, such as Orbital, while other bands such as Coldcut have featured samples of the theme.

Comedian and singer Mitch Benn's 2002 album Radio Face features a song entitled "Doctor Who Girl". The song talks about how the singer would like to find a girlfriend who is like the female companions of Doctor Who.

Since the series' renewal on BBC, a genre has developed under the name 'Trock' (a term created by YouTuber and (at the time) unsigned musician Alex Day, aka Nerimon), meaning Time Lord Rock. Propagated mainly via the internet on sites such as YouTube, Trock songs include references to the show's theme tune, as well as characters and plots from the show. The band Chameleon Circuit produces music exclusively relating to Doctor Who, and in addition to general fandom songs, has episode-specific songs like 'Kiss the Girl' and 'The Big Bang 2'. They have a fast-growing online following, and as of 2011 have released two albums: Chameleon Circuit in 2009, and Still Got Legs in July 2011, both on DFTBA records. Still Got Legs charted on the Billboard Heatseekers chart at No. 23.

The industrial/EBM band Rotersand also features themes related to Doctor Who. Mainly the song "Exterminate, Annihilate, Destroy" using Dalek soundclips.

== TV series ==
Whovians is an Australian comedy panel, chat show hosted by Rove McManus, who engages with a team of four Whovians or superfans of Doctor Who to analyse, critique and unravel the mysteries of the show. The first show screened on Sunday 16 April 2017 at 8.30pm AEST on ABC2, as a companion piece to the first episode of Season 10 of Doctor Who which had just screened on the ABC.

== See also ==
- Celebrity appearances in Doctor Who
- Doctor Who in North America
- Doctor Who in Australia
- "From The Doctor to my son Thomas"
