= Chicago TARDIS =

Science fiction convention focusing on Doctor Who and related media

- Status: Active
- Genre: Science fiction
- Locations: Chicago, Illinois
- Country: United States
- Inaugurated: 2000
- Attendance: 1100+ (approx. as of 2017)
- Organizer: Alien Entertainment
- Website: https://www.chicagotardis.com

Chicago TARDIS is an annual North American science fiction convention focusing on the British television series Doctor Who and related programs, held the weekend after Thanksgiving in Chicago. This event has been rated among the top five conventions for fans of Doctor Who living in the United States. The event bills itself as the “premier Doctor Who event” for the midwest. The conference, along with the Los Angeles Gallifrey One, helped show fan support well before the BBC, having stopped production in 1989, decided to revive Doctor Who in 2005. The Chicago event is organized by Alien Entertainment, a Chicago area entertainment store focused on sci-fi and pop culture. Chicago TARDIS has been held every year since 2000 in the Chicago area and has featured actors, actresses, script editors, writers, visual effects designers, directors, and screenwriters associated with Doctor Who in various ways.

== List of Chicago TARDIS events ==
Year	Featured Guests	Dates	Location
2000	Sylvester McCoy, Mary Tamm, John Leeson, Jason Haigh-Ellery, Gary Russell, Lars Pearson	November 24–26, 2000	Sheraton Arlington Park, Arlington Heights IL
2001	Nicholas Courtney, John Levene, Richard Franklin, Jason Haigh-Ellery, Gary Russell, Caroline Morris, Bill Baggs and the BBV Crew, Lars Pearson, Arnold T. Blumberg	November 23–25, 2001	Sheraton Arlington Park, Arlington Heights IL
2002	Sarah Sutton, Matthew Waterhouse, Jason Haigh-Ellery, Arnold T. Blumberg	November 29- December 1, 2002	Sheraton Northwest, Chicago
2003	Colin Baker, Frazer Hines, Anneke Wills, Michael Sheard, Jason Haigh-Ellery, India Fisher, the BBV crew, Lars Pearson, Arnold T. Blumberg	November 28–30, 2003	Sheraton Northwest, Chicago
2004	Paul McGann, Peter Purves, Terry Molloy, Yee Jee Tso, Stewart Bevan, Jason Haigh-Ellery, Gary Russell, India Fisher, Robert Shearman, Scott Alan Woodard, Bill Baggs, Lars Pearson, Arnold T. Blumberg	November 26–28, 2004	Wyndham Hotel, Rosemont
2005	Peter Davison, Nicola Bryant, John Schwab, Alan Ruscoe, Jason Haigh-Ellery, Gary Russell, Maggie Stables, Robert Shearman, Nigel Fairs, Siri O’Neill, Scott Alan Woodard, Lars Pearson, Christa Dickson, Arnold T. Blumberg, Shaun Lyon	November 25–27, 2005	Wyndham Hotel, Rosemont
2006	Sylvester McCoy, Sophie Aldred, Maureen O'Brien, Gabriel Woolf, Jason Haigh-Ellery, Clare Buckfield, Nigel Fairs, Scott Alan Woodard, Arnold T. Blumberg, Lars Pearson, Christa Dickson, Shaun Lyon	November 24–26, 2006	Wyndham Hotel, Rosemont
2007	Eric Roberts, Eliza Roberts, Nicholas Briggs, Robert Shearman, Jason Haigh-Ellery, Scott Alan Woodard, Lars Pearson, Christa Dickson, Arnold T. Blumberg	November 23–25, 2007	Crowne Plaza Hotel, Rosemont
2008	Colin Baker, Elisabeth Sladen, Paul Cornell, Nicholas Briggs, Robert Shearman, Gary Russell, Jason Haigh-Ellery, Simon Guerrier, India Fisher, Lisa Bowerman, Ciara Janson, Laura Doddington, Lars Pearson, Christa Dickson, Arnold T. Blumberg, Kate Orman, Jonathan Blum	November 28–30, 2008	Westin Lombard Yorktown Center
2009	Paul McGann, Daphne Ashbrook, Yee Jee Tso, Naoko Mori, Phil Collinson, Gary Russell, Robert Shearman, Jason Haigh-Ellery, India Fisher, Nicholas Briggs, Tony Lee, Arnold T. Blumberg, Lars Pearson, Christa Dickson	November 27–29, 2009	Westin Lombard Yorktown Center
2010	Arnold T. Blumberg, Lisa Bowerman, Nicholas Briggs, Gareth David-Lloyd, Terrance Dicks, Christa Dickson, Laura Doddington, Simon Guerrier, Toby Hadoke, Jason Haigh-Ellery, Frazer Hines, Louise Jameson, Ciara Janson, Tommy Knight, Tony Lee, Ian McNeice, Kai Owen, Lars Pearson, Lynnette Porter, Gary Russell, Robert Shearman, Lynne M. Thomas	November 26–28, 2010	Westin Lombard Yorktown Center
2011	Arnold T. Blumberg, Nicholas Briggs, Graeme Burk, Beth Chalmers, Benjamin Cook, Christa Dickson, Richard Dinnick, Peter Davison, Janet Fielding, Jason Haigh-Ellery, Tony Lee, Tara O'Shea, Lars Pearson, Robert Shearman, Mark Sheppard, Andrew Hayden-Smith, Stacey Smith?, Lynne M. Thomas, Matthew Waterhouse	November 25–27, 2011	Westin Lombard Yorktown Center
2012	Sophie Aldred, Mark Ayres, Jonathan Blum, Arnold T. Blumberg, Nicholas Briggs, Graeme Burk, Andrew Cartmel, Paul Marc Davis, Richard Dinnick, Simon Fisher-Becker, Burn Gorman, Lisa Greenwood, Toby Hadoke, Jason Haigh-Ellery, Tony Lee, Sylvester McCoy, Ian McNeice, Anjli Mohindra, L.M. Myles, Philip Olivier, Kate Orman, Lars Pearson, Amy Pemberton, Gary Russell, Stacey Smith?, Colin Spaull, Paul Spragg, Deborah Stanish, Lynne M. Thomas	November 23–25, 2012	Westin Lombard Yorktown Center
2013	Daphne Ashbrook, Colin Baker, Ken Bentley, Jonathan Blum, Nicola Bryant, Graeme Burk, Tracey Childs, Peter Davison, Jason Haigh-Ellery, Frazer Hines, Richard Hope, Michael Jayston, Louise Jameson, Tony Lee, Paul McGann, Dick Mills, Terry Molloy, L.M. Myles, Kate Orman, Lars Pearson, Amy Pemberton, Stacey Smith?, Paul Spragg, Dan Starkey, Ed Stradling, Sarah Sutton, Michael Damian Thomas, Nina Toussaint-White	November 29-December 1, 2013	Westin Lombard Yorktown Center
2014	Annette Badland, Nicholas Briggs, Graeme Burk, Noel Clarke, Camille Coduri, Ellie Darcey-Alden, Joseph Darcey-Alden, Dominic Glynn, Jason Haigh-Ellery, Sonita Henry, Frazer Hines, Mat Irvine, L.M. Myles, Wendy Padbury, Billie Piper, Stacey Smith?, Michael Damian Thomas, Deborah Watling	November 28–30, 2014	Westin Lombard Yorktown Center
2015	Samuel Anderson, Nicholas Briggs, Seán Carlson, Richard Franklin, Burn Gorman, Jason Haigh-Ellery, David J. Howe, Christopher Jones, Finn Jones, Alex Kingston, Tony Lee, John Levene, Sarah Louise Madison, Katy Manning, Chase Masterson, Paul McGann, Ross Mullan, Ingrid Oliver, Tom Spilsbury, Stacey Smith?, Sam Stone	November 27–29, 2015	Westin Lombard Yorktown Center
2016	Elliot Chapman, Nigel Fairs, Michelle Gomez, Lisa Greenwood, Jason Haigh-Ellery, Frazer Hines, Louise Jameson, Christopher Jones, Tony Lee, John Leeson, Wendy Padbury, Lars Pearson, Peter Purves, Gary Russell, Robert Shearman, Stacey Smith?, Tim Treloar, Deborah Watling, Anneke Wills	November 25–27, 2016	Westin Lombard Yorktown Center
2017	Sophie Aldred, Colin Baker, Nicholas Briggs, Nicola Bryant, Peter Davison, Janet Fielding, Lisa Greenwood, Jason Haigh-Ellery, Frazer Hines, Christopher Jones, Tony Lee, Sylvester McCoy, Philip Olivier, Stacey Smith?	November 24–26, 2017	Westin Lombard Yorktown Center
2018	Andrew Beech, Nicholas Briggs, Benji Clifford, Tony Curran, Jon Davey, Simon Fisher-Becker, Jason Haigh-Ellery, Graeme Harper, Hattie Hayridge, Frazer Hines, Rosie Jane, Christopher Jones, Tony Lee, Pearl Mackie, Ian McNeice, Sarah Louise Madison, Ross Mullan, Ingrid Oliver, Wendy Padbury, Colin Spaull, Catrin Stewart, Kelly Yates	November 23–25, 2018	Westin Lombard Yorktown Center
2019	Richard Ashton, Greg Austin, Emma Campbell-Jones, Ryan Carnes, Tosin Cole, Arthur Darvill, Richard Franklin, Jason Haigh-Ellery, Frazer Hines, Sophie Hopkins, David J. Howe, Louise Jameson, Christopher Jones, Tony Lee, John Leeson, Katy Manning, Sylvester McCoy, Paul McGann, Edward Russell, Vivian Oparah, The Sevateem, Stacey Smith?, Rhianne Starbuck, Samantha Stone	November 29-December 1, 2019	Westin Lombard Yorktown Center
2020	Paul McGann, Sophie Aldred, Frazer Hines, Lisa Greenwood, Nicholas Briggs, Helen Goldwyn, Jason Haigh-Ellery, Mark Ayres	November 27–29, 2020	Online (Due to COVID-19)
2021	Colin Baker, Lauren Cornelius, Jason Haigh-Ellery, Frazer Hines, Michael Jayston, Mickey Lewis, Neve McIntosh, Sadie Miller, Terry Molloy, Clem So, Colin Spaull	November 26–28, 2021	Westin Lombard Yorktown Center
2022	Sophie Aldred, Daisy Ashford, Lauren Cornelius, Jason Haigh-Ellery, Frazer Hines, Sylvester McCoy, Kevin McNally, Sophia Myles, Stephen Noonan, Wendy Padbury, Bhavnisha Parmar, Tim Treloar	November 25–27, 2022	Westin Lombard Yorktown Center
2023	Colin Baker, Lisa Bowerman, Jonathon Carley, Jon Davey Peter Davison, Janet Fielding, Carole Ann Ford, Jason Haigh-Ellery, Mickey Lewis, Katy Manning, Sylvester McCoy, Stacey Smith?, Mark Strickson, Rachel Talalay, Michael Troughton	November 24–26, 2023	Westin Lombard Yorktown Center
2024	Sophie Aldred, Daisy Ashford, Mark Ayres, Jan Chappell, Brian Croucher, Sacha Dhawan, Dominic Glynn, Jaye Griffiths, Jason Haigh-Ellery, Kieran Highman, Frazer Hines, Safiyya Ingar, Tommy Knight, Jo Martin, Sylvester McCoy, Paul McGann, Sonny McGann, Ian McNeice, Sadie Miller, Wendy Padbury, Stacey Smith?	November 29-December 1, 2024	Westin Lombard Yorktown Center
2025	Annette Badland, Seán Carlsen, Steph de Whalley, Christopher Eccleston, Carole Ann Ford, Jason Haigh-Ellery, Frazer Hines, Christopher Jones, Paul Kasey, Jacqueline King, Mickey Lewis, Stephen Love, Alex Macqueen, Katy Manning, Jo Martin, Rebecca Nation, Miles Richardson, Clem So, Michael Troughton, Susan Twist	November 28-30, 2025	Westin Lombard Yorktown Center
2026	Daisy Ashford, Geoffrey Beevers, Nicola Bryant, Alexander Devrient, Michelle Greenidge, Jane Goddard, Lisa Greenwood, Jason Haigh-Ellery, Frazer Hines, Christopher Jones, Charlotte McBurney, Rebecca Nation, Wendy Padbury, Isaac Rouse, Rob Shearman, Jodie Whittaker, Lizzie Worsdell	November 27-29, 2026	Westin Lombard Yorktown Center
