= Lars Pearson =

American writer

- Born: Lars Pearson; 1973 (age 52–53); Iowa
- Education: Coe College
- Occupations: Writer, Editor, Publisher
- Spouse: Christa Dickson
- Writing career
- Language: English
- Subject: Guides to TV shows
- Notable work: Unauthorized Doctor Who books

Lars Pearson (born 1973, in Iowa) is an American writer, high school teacher, editor, and journalist. He is the owner/publisher of Mad Norwegian Press, a publishing company specializing in reference guides to television shows including Buffy the Vampire Slayer, Angel and Doctor Who, plus the Faction Paradox range of novels and comic books. He is also co-author, with Lance Parkin, of "Ahistory: An Unauthorized History of the Doctor Who Universe," which puts every Doctor Who-related story onto a single timeline from the beginning of the universe to its end.

== Education ==
Pearson attended Coe College studying writing at their Writing Center. He was part of the 1995 graduating class.

== Career ==
Pearson's writing career started as an editor for a newspaper then moved to magazines. He attained a position with Wizard Entertainment as the price guide editor for the magazine Wizard: The Comics Magazine, a magazine about comic books. He later worked for collectables magazines including ToyFare about collectible action figures and InQuest Gamer, a magazine devoted to collectible card games. While working at ToyFare, he was interviewed by U.S. News & World Report for his expertise in collectables.

Pearson later moved into writing guide books for television shows. He wrote Redeemed: The Unauthorized Guide to Angel, a guide book about the television series Angel. He has also written guides for the cartoon series Transformers and G.I. Joe.

Pearson's guides have been used by other authors as in the case when author Robert G. Weiner used the G.I. Joe guide and Transformers guide to help write Marvel graphic novels and related publications: an annotated guide to comics.

Many of the books Pearson writes are unauthorized, meaning they are not approved by the companies that produce the shows and cannot include their pictures.

=== Mad Norwegian Press ===
Pearson started his own publishing business, Mad Norwegian Press in 2001. The main focus of the business are guide books to science fiction. It also produces novels from freelance writers such as Harlan Ellison, Steve Lyons and Peter David. In order to keep expenses low, the company only employs two people, Pearson and his wife.

In 2002, Mad Norwegian started producing the book series Faction Paradox, about a group of time travelers. Pearson acts as editor for the series.

== Doctor Who ==
Pearson became a fan of Doctor Who when he saw it broadcast on Iowa's public television station IPTV. His fondness of the show led him to write his first book, I, Who: The Unauthorized Guide to Doctor Who Novels. He uses the books to provide insight into the TV series as well as facts.

Pearson has written 12 books on the television series Doctor Who and is considered an expert on the show. The Des Moines Science Fiction Society has labeled him "one of the foremost experts on 'Doctor Who' in North America."

Pearson's expertise on Doctor Who makes him sought out by fans of the show and science fiction conventions and he has hosted Doctor Who pledge drives on public television. Pearson is often a featured speaker at Doctor Who festivals and appears at many major science fiction conventions.

- 2001 – The Twelfth Regeneration of Gallifrey One (Van Nuys, CA)
- 2001 – Chicago TARDIS (Chicago, IL)
- 2003 – Gallifrey One: Episode XIV – The Faction Paradox (Van Nuys, CA)
- 2003 – Chicago TARDIS (Chicago, IL)
- 2004 – Gallifrey One's Fifteen Minutes of Fame (Van Nuys, CA)
- 2004 – Chicago TARDIS (Chicago, IL)
- 2005 – The Sixteen Swashbucklers of Gallifrey One (Van Nuys, CA)
- 2005 – Chicago TARDIS (Chicago, IL)
- 2007 – The Eighteenth Amendment of Gallifrey One (Los Angeles, CA)
- 2007 – Chicago TARDIS (Chicago, IL)
- 2008 – Gallifrey One's Nineteenth Symphony: Opus 2008 (Los Angeles, CA)
- 2008 – Chicago TARDIS (Chicago, IL)
- 2008 — DemiCon 19 (Des Moines, IA)
- 2009 — Dragon*Con (Atlanta, GA)
- 2010 – Chicago TARDIS (Chicago, IL)
- 2011 — Dragon*Con (Atlanta, GA)
- 2012 — DemiCon 23 (Des Moines, IA)
- 2012 — TimeGate (Atlanta, GA)
- 2012 — Dragon*Con (Atlanta, GA)
- 2012 — Gaylaxicon (Minneapolis, MN)
- 2012 — Chicago TARDIS (Chicago, IL)

== Awards ==
Pearson's book About Time 3: The Unauthorized Guide to Doctor Who (Seasons 7 to 11) (2nd Edition) was on the longlist for the BSFA award for non-fiction in 2009. Chicks Dig Time Lords: A Celebration of Doctor Who by the Women Who Love It, a book in which Pearson served as publisher, won a 2011 Hugo Award for Best Related Work. "Chicks Dig Comics: A Celebration of Comic Books by the Women Who Love Them" and "Chicks Unravel Time: Women Journey Through Every Season of Doctor Who" have both been nominated for a 2013 Hugo Award for Best Related Work.

== Personal life ==
Pearson is a resident of Des Moines, Iowa and is married to Christa Dickson. Dickson helps develop and maintain Iowa Public Televisions's websites and also helps run Mad Norwegian Press. She graduated from Coe College in 2001.

== Publications ==
- I, Who: The Unauthorized Guide to Doctor Who Novels, 1999 ISBN 0-9673746-0-X
- I, Who 2: The Unauthorized Guide to Doctor Who Novels and Audios, 2001 ISBN 1-57032-900-1
- Prime Targets: The Unauthorized Story Guide to Transformers, Beast Wars & Beast Machines, 2001 ISBN 1-57032-901-X
- Now You Know: The Unauthorized Guide to GI Joe TV & Comics, 2002 ISBN 1-57032-902-8
- I, Who 3: The Unauthorized Guide to Doctor Who Novels and Audios, 2003 ISBN 0-9725959-1-0
- Dusted: The Unauthorized Guide to Buffy the Vampire Slayer (with Lawrence Miles and Christa Dickson) 2003 ISBN 0-9725959-0-2
- AHistory: An Unauthorized History of the Doctor Who Universe (written by Lance Parkin with additional material by Pearson), 2006 ISBN 0-9725959-9-6
- Redeemed: The Unauthorized Guide to Angel (with Christa Dickson), 2006 ISBN 0-9725959-3-7
- AHistory: An Unauthorized History of the Doctor Who Universe [Second Edition] (written by Lance Parkin with additional material by Pearson), 2007 ISBN 0-9759446-6-5
- About Time 3: The Unauthorized Guide to Doctor Who (Seasons 7 to 11) (2nd Edition) (written by Tat Wood, Lawrence Miles, Lars Pearson (Editor)), 2009 ISBN 978-0-9759446-7-7
- About Time 6: The Unauthorized Guide to Doctor Who (Seasons 22 to 26, the TV Movie) (written by Tat Wood with additional material by Pearson), 2007 ISBN 0-9759446-5-7
- Wanting to Believe: A Critical Guide to X-Files, Millennium and The Lone Gunmen (written by Robert Shearman, with additional material by Pearson), 2009 ISBN 978-0-9759446-9-1
- AHistory: An Unauthorized History of the Doctor Who Universe [Third Edition] (co-written with Lance Parkin), 2012 ISBN 978-1935234111

== Other books ==
- Faction Paradox: The Book of the War (contributing author, uncredited), 2002 ISBN 1-57032-905-2
