= Zerinza =

Australian Doctor Who fanzine

Zerinza was the first, and for many years the only regular Australian Doctor Who fanzine. It ran continuously from 1976 to 1986 when edited and published by Antony Howe, for the Australasian Doctor Who Fan Club (ADWFC), reaching issue number 35. Since then, there have been several isolated issues on special topics, sporadically up to mid-2000, edited by others but most with some degree of input from Howe (e.g. three almost completed issues, and using other materials in his files). Reviews, articles and interviews in this "high-quality" fanzine were authoritative and are cited in serious studies of Doctor Who and some have been republished in books of interviews. The fanzine was for a decade the journal for the ADWFC (membership and subscription being combined) and it played a key role in creating and expanding Doctor Who fandom in Australia, reaching about 1,000 subscribers by the mid-1980s. It was partly founded to rally fans against the Australian Broadcasting Commission's decision to cease purchasing the Doctor Who series (made in mid-1976), launching a "Save Doctor Who Campaign" with the first issue, it contained relating news items thereafter. Zerinza, and Howe (as founder and President of the ADWFC), were often credited by fans with the subsequent decision by the ABC to resume and increase screening the series (from 1978).

== Introduction ==
Zerinza was the first continuous Doctor Who fanzine published in Australia, appearing fairly regularly for eight years with subsequent issues at irregular intervals. It gained an international readership, and for many years was the only continuous Doctor Who fanzine in the country, other clubs or fans only briefly issuing newsletters or other items. Prior to Zerinza there had only been a few Australian fanzines with occasional Doctor Who material in them, such as two by students at Sydney University: the main one being Jon Noble's South of Harad, East of Rhun (mainly a Tolkien 'zine, hence the name), and a major analytical article on the series by Terry Dowling, a future Science Fiction and Fantasy author, as a one-off splash in a 1975 issue of Enigma, the fanzine of the Sydney University Science Fiction Association (S.U.S.F.A.). As examples, these were to feed directly into the origins of Zerinza, and their editors encouraged and helped in its gestation. There was no other fanzine dedicated to the series in the country, nor related to a fanclub. Although a few fans did receive the English fanzine of Keith Miller.

== Beginnings ==
Around mid-1976, the Australian Broadcasting Commission (ABC) had decided to cease purchase of the BBC TV series Doctor Who, a decision which was communicated to the S.U.S.F.A. in reply to its lobbying for extra repeats of the series. The S.U.S.F.A. President Antony Howe immediately launched a campaign to "Save Doctor Who" in August. This consisted of a demonstration of fans outside the ABC offices in Sydney with the Association's Dalek which had been built for a Dalek race in Melbourne. Howe and Dallas Jones issued press releases, and Howe had posters and leaflets printed about the ABC decision. He also formed contacts with other clubs and individuals in several cities in Australia, as well as the main British fans who had recently formed the Doctor Who Appreciation Society. To keep the campaign to save the show going, Howe also decided to launch a fanzine to report on news and create a basis for a nationwide pressure group. He selected as its name "Zerinza", a word meaning "Good Success" according to a purported Dictionary of Dalek words in the 1965 Dalek Annual. The first issue of Zerinza was published by Howe, in September, with the assistance of the S.U.S.F.A. fanzine editor who did the printing at cost which made it all possible. Over three hundred copies were printed and the premier issue contained a report on the demonstration, news about the ABC's scheduling policies for the series, reviews, and plans for the club.

Zerinza was launched at a S.U.S.F.A. campus screening of the film Dr. Who and the Daleks on September 21, 1976, hoping to reach as many fans as possible (all who attended being given a copy), and it was also mailed out to scores of potential subscribers with the aid of editors of other fan publications in Sydney (Jon Noble's South of Harad, East of Rhun), and Melbourne (Leigh Edmond's Fanewsletter). The first issue of Zerinza was distributed free, but thereafter by subscription, and with sales through science fiction bookshops, mainly "Galaxy" in Sydney, and "Space Age" in Melbourne, but also some others around the country over the years. Subscribers were deemed to be members of the new "Australasian Doctor Who Fan Club". After Howe's resignation as president and editor (1984), in the 1990s this club was renamed several times, and is now known as the Doctor Who Club of Australia (or DWCA).

== Early years ==
The early issues were printed on quarto pages, and were fairly short; the first, being free, was just six pages, but other single issues ranged from about 12 to 20 pages, and consisted in the main of articles, story outlines, some fan fiction, book reviews, and latterly reviews of the latest season of Doctor Who. Marking a major advance in quality, and the largest early issue, was the double issue, #5/6 (late 1977) with colour cover artwork, and extra pages of text and an interview with actor Barrie Ingham, who had been in a play in Sydney. Others of the early issues were notable for the fan art of Andrew Szabo who had worked for Hanna Barbera animation studios in Sydney, he did the cover art for many issues, internal illustrations, and his cartoon version of the TV series Pyramids of Mars was spread over two issues, #7, and #12.

The first nine issues were printed for Howe by a friend at the university, Van Ikin (now Doctor Van Ikin of the English Department of the University of Western Australia) who printed the S.U.S.F.A.'s journal "Enigma" on a small offset press which kept the costs to a minimum. The free issue did not net many subscribers, as many seemed wary that it was too short, so it had a slow start, and a six-month gap between issues #2 and #3 due to university commitments in early 1977. Steady appearance from #3 (July 1977), for a year (to #7 in May 1978) helped the subscriber base grow slowly. The decision of the ABC to screen the series as a flagship programme in 1978, should have launched the 'zine to wider readership, but Howe who had left university and was unemployed, had no money to overcome the perilous production situation, and delays this time were made far worse by the old S.U.S.F.A. machine which was increasingly unreliable, hindering any growth. There was a prolonged delay between issue #7 (out in May 1978) and #8/9 (due in June, but delayed until March the following year). The delays greatly annoyed some subscribers and it might all have ended there, but by 1979 Howe was employed and was able to use the many parts that had been printed by Ikin, and could afford to fill the gaps using a commercial printer. He issued the 'zine with a colour cover of Ice Warriors (drawn by Howe) and a huge fold-out Dalek photo poster included by way of apology for the delay. Even with this chequered period of two and a half years, the first "Editorial" in a 1979 Zerinza stated it now had "over 150" subscribers. It probably also had sales of another 100 or so in shops and at fan events. Fairly respectable in fanzine terms, but not the "Good Success" claimed by the so-called Dalek word "Zerinza."

Following the decision of ABC TV to continue such an emphasis on screening the series during 1979, the club's membership increase continued. This was accelerated by Tom Baker's visit to Australia for an ABC TV promotional tour in February 1979. The ABC also began to give out the club's address. All of which was a stimulus to the magazine, apparently doubling sales by the end of the year. The ABC allowed the club a lengthy interview with Baker, which was the centrepiece of a Special Issue (#10/11) devoted to the Fourth Doctor's visit Down Under, with fan reports from around the country, and many photos supplied by ABC publicity, which removed any copyright difficulties. It was largely edited by Howe's mother, Rosemary, and marked the first full switch to commercial printing and double-quarto format with centrefolds of photographs. The completion of Andrew Szabo's Pyramids of Mars comic, Zerinza #12, saw a return to using the old machine as Howe became the S.U.S.F.A.'s printer on Ikin's departure to work inter-state. Howe took over the now repaired machine and used the opportunity to reprint most of the early issues in late 1979 and into 1980, which explains some dating discrepancies as reprints had the correct publication dates, since some original dates had earlier been in error due to hold ups after their date had been printed.

For the first club public event, a "Party" on Nov. 24 1979, Howe had Zerinza #13 commercially printed again to utilise the wider selection of photographs now available through the ABC's Publicity Department. Unemployment, saw the 50 page triple issue #14/15/16 and #17 printed at home by Howe, but the membership of the club was now great enough thereafter for economies of scale to have enabled all issues (from #20 to #35) to be commercially printed.

While still used for news and ephemeral notices, the occasional lengthy delays continued. Issue #18/19 (a Jon Pertwee Special Issue) was due in August 1980 but could not be printed in sequence due to delays, so the subscribers were sent #20 instead. Such hiccups had rendered Zerinza far less useful as a vehicle for news than originally planned as gossip or BBC announcements naturally often dated very quickly. This led to a club newsletter (see below). The Pertwee issue was, in the event, never issued by Howe, as it was long delayed; after being abandoned in the later 1980s it finally appeared in the 1990s.

== More Professional Style ==
The 1980s saw a shift in the fanzine's style away from the more folksy nature of its early fanzine origins adopting a more serious approach. In mid-1980, Howe himself printed issue #14/15/16, billed as a "special issue", it was a popular novelisation of The Daleks' Master Plan, by his mother, Rosemary (since reprinted several times and sold around the world). This story had never been screened in Australia due to censorship problems, and there appeared no likelihood of a book at the time, so it had been worked on for several years as a means to enable Australian fans to enjoy the story they had missed. The club also began to publish a newsletter which took over the news and pen pals sections (see below). In effect, shorn of the ephemeral parts of the contents, and increasingly with professional printing, the fanzine rapidly changed in appearance, there being a big drop in the amount of artwork (Szabo was now rarely a contributor), and an increasingly high quality photographic content, fan fiction was also dropped. A growing range of graduate writers saw the contents became more serious and analytical, such as an article on companions, Regeneration (Tom Baker to Peter Davison), and lengthy season reviews in several issues. These issues often had a home printed "Supplement" of letters, detailed fan club surveys, or other items (usually 4, sometimes 6 foolscap pages). Becoming almost professional in standards with enhanced print quality, some of the debates in its pages were taken seriously around the fan world, and Zerinza continued appearing moderately regularly for the next few years.

By mid-1984 the fanzine circulation reached its high point with a print run of 1,800 (#32), but it was notable for Howe's highly critical comments about Twin Dilemma, the introductory story of the new Doctor, Colin Baker, and Producer John Nathan-Turner, asserting (prophetically) that the BBC would axe the series if this marked the style of the future, and he announced he was to wind up the fanzine in disgust. This roused a storm of protest, as by then hundreds of copies of the fanzine was being sold by fans overseas in the United Kingdom and the United States. Within a year the BBC did indeed "postpone" the series, a move widely seen as the axe. On the wrappers of "Data Extract" and in other fan publications, Howe continued to attack the production team for the bad ratings and increased violence, slamming the show as "Doctor Whooligan". Then completing a master's degree, Howe did not have time to publish another issue for two years - an out-sized triple issue (33/34/35) in 1986, the last issue for subscribers. This featured the highest quality printing in the fanzine's history (a removable poster cover of the first Doctor, with 8 page centre spread). The main article by Howe was a detailed examination of William Hartnell as the Doctor, and he argued that his Doctor had been misrepresented as a harsh "alien" by some fans, and that he had not in fact kidnapped the first companions, Ian and Barbara, but had acted to protect his grandchild Susan. Thereafter Howe ceased to publish it.

The fanzine did not totally die off after that, however. The new President of the club, Dallas Jones, published a few issues (see below), completed one issue delayed for ten years, #18/19: a Jon Pertwee Special Issue originally due in 1980. Also, some of the interviews that were done for Zerinza in the 1970s and '80s (of Jon Pertwee, Katy Manning, Tom Baker, Peter Davison, and Terence Dudley), have since been reprinted in the three books of interviews "Talkback: The Unofficial and Unauthorised Doctor Who Interview Book," all edited by Stephen James Walker, published over 2005-07 by Telos Publishing Ltd., in England. Those with Manning and Dudley had not been published before. Zerinza also included reprints of interviews that had appeared in other English fan publications such as the Doctor Who Appreciation Society journal Tardis, all used with permission.

Zerinza was lodged with copyright libraries the National Library of Australia, and the State Library of New South Wales and Fisher Library of Sydney University, and in 1977 Zerinza was granted the International Serial Number ISSN 0314-0490 by the National Library. These libraries should have a complete run of issues at least to number 35 as they were regularly sent issues, but some issues had gone missing from the NSW State Library by the 1990s.

== Spin-Offs ==
There were at least two one-off Zerinza newsletters, but these were just occasional, either listed using the fanzine numbering (e.g. Zerinza #13 A, mailed out to advise fans of a visit of the Fourth Doctor, Tom Baker, in early 1979), or as separate sheets, variously named. With the "Dalek Masterplan" issue of Zerinza in mid-1980 was another such single-sheet newsletter. A few months later, a regular writer for Zerinza, Dallas Jones, suggested he publish a six-weekly newsletter to fill the void left by the irregular schedules of Zerinza which had lengthy gaps between some issues and was again facing a new production hold-up. The regular club newsletter first appeared in November 1980, being printed by Howe on the S.U.S.F.A. printing machine for the next few years. It was later renamed Data Extract, and continues to appear regularly, recently reaching its 200th issue.

For several years there were also "Doctor Who Calendars", the first printed by Howe. Later ones were professionally printed and Howe researched and added comprehensive lists of key Doctor Who-related dates for each month.

== Later Special Issues ==
Much unpublished material still existed in Howe's files, and in 1990 when going overseas he gave a pile of articles and half completed issues to Dallas Jones, the then President of the Australian Doctor Who Club. He completed one, the vastly delayed issue (due in 1980) #18/19: a Jon Pertwee Special Issue; and changing the format to A3 instead of the traditional quarto, Jones published two subsequent special issues of Zerinza, one was a novelisation of The Power of the Daleks, the other a novelisation of The Pirate Planet; a few years later another three issues of Zerinza were edited and published by Damian Shanahan, one on censorship of the programme in Australia; another was a review issue of the Colin Baker era; and finally a City of Death novelisation; Shanahan also redesigned and reissued the Dalek Masterplan issue. In 2006 Howe started to set up a website for Zerinza, but work and other commitments prevented his getting far with this.
