= Milkovich =

Milkovich is a Slavic surname. Notable people with the surname include:

- Ed Melvin (born Ed Milkovich, 1916–2004), American basketball player
- John Milkovich, American politician and attorney
- Peter Milkovich (born 1966), Canadian field hockey player
- Sarah Milkovich, American astrophysicist
- Zack Milkovich, American politician
