= The Doctor Who Years =

Streaming video programme

The Doctor Who Years was a streaming video, charting the history of the British science fiction television series Doctor Who, which was broadcast on BBCi's official Doctor Who website, where it is no longer available for viewing. It was produced to coincide with the return of the series to BBC Television screens in 2005, and was intended to present a potted history of the original Doctor Who series, broadcast between 1963–1989, in a manner which would be entertaining to new viewers, unfamiliar with the original series. The series was extremely successful, achieving hundreds of thousands of 'hits' during its first few months.

== Presentation ==
The video was presented in three parts, The Sixties, The Seventies and The Eighties, and featured material from every Doctor Who serial, presented chronologically and accompanied by narrative text and pop music that had featured in the UK Singles Chart at the time the clips were originally broadcast.

== Production notes ==
- The Sixties was produced by SVS, The Seventies and The Eighties were produced by Ed Stradling. The videos were commissioned by James Goss, then editor of the BBCi's Doctor Who website.
- The videos had originally been produced, in more basic form, by Ed Stradling and Peter Finklestone for the Doctor Who fan convention Panopticon, in 2000. These were influenced heavily by The Telefantasy Years which was made by David Palfreyman and Paul Vanezis in 1990.
