= Gallifrey One =

Science fiction convention focusing on Doctor Who and related media

- Status: Active (set to end 2028)
- Genre: Science fiction
- Locations: Los Angeles, California
- Country: United States
- Inaugurated: 1990
- Attendance: 3900+ (approx. as of 2018)
- Organizer: Gallifrey One Conventions / Institute for Specialized Literature (ISL) Inc.
- Filing status: Non-profit
- Website: http://www.gallifreyone.com

Gallifrey One is an annual North American science fiction convention focusing primarily on the British television series Doctor Who and its spin-offs, Torchwood, K9, The Sarah Jane Adventures and The War Between the Land and the Sea, with an additional emphasis on British and American science fiction television media, held each February in Los Angeles. The event bills itself as "the largest and longest-running annual Doctor Who convention in the world". Sponsored by Gallifrey One Conventions and the Institute for Specialized Literature (ISL) Inc., a California not-for-profit organization, Gallifrey One has been held every year since 1990 in the greater Los Angeles area and has featured guests from a variety of genre television programs including Babylon 5, Star Trek, Alien Nation, Gene Roddenberry's Andromeda, Buffy the Vampire Slayer and Battlestar Galactica.

Gallifrey One is the formal name of the convention; the event has always featured the full name of the event, along with a play on the iteration as drawn from popular media, such as "Gallifrey One Across the Eighth Dimension" (from Buckaroo Banzai), "The Tenth Planet of Gallifrey One" (a Doctor Who reference), and "Gallifrey One's Fifteen Minutes of Fame" (a reference to the phrase coined by Andy Warhol).

The convention's annual charity auction is named for the late Lost in Space actor Bob May, a long-time guest and dealer at the event before his death. The convention is family-friendly, with activities for children.

The Outpost Gallifrey website, originally set up to advertise the convention, became a very popular Doctor Who fan website internationally for many years, until it ceased operations in July 2009; the website address at that time reverted to providing convention information only.

Gallifrey One is known for its badge ribbon tradition, that attendees make and give to each other as a way to reference a particular episode that has special meaning to them and other fans. Gallifrey One is also known for Cosplay where attendees make and wear costumes for their favorite characters in the Doctor Who Universe. There is also a masquerade that is held known as the Masquerade of Mandragora each Saturday night of the convention.

Gallifrey One also has a dealers room, where attendees can purchase science fiction themed souvenirs, jewelry, media, and clothing. The dealers room also has some actors and media personalities signing autographs.

== List of Gallifrey One events ==
Event	Convention Name / Principal Doctor Who Guests (including other media guests, first appearance only)	Date	Location
1	Gallifrey One	May 25–28, 1990	Los Angeles Airport Hilton
1	Jon Pertwee, John Nathan-Turner, John Levene, Ronald D. Moore		
2	Gallifrey One: The Sequel	May 3–5, 1991	Pasadena Hilton
2	Sylvester McCoy, Deborah Watling, Richard Franklin, Larry Niven, Barbara Hambly		
3	Gallifrey One in 3-D	February 21–23, 1992	Los Angeles Airport Hilton
3	Nicholas Courtney, Sophie Aldred, David Gerrold, Judith and Garfield Reeves-Stevens		
4	Gallifrey One Goes Fourth	February 26–28, 1993	Burbank Airport Hilton
4	Nicola Bryant, Frazer Hines, J. Michael Straczynski		
5	A Fifth of Gallifrey One	February 18–21, 1994	Glendale Red Lion
5	Colin Baker, Terrance Dicks, Barry Letts, John Levene, Forrest J Ackerman		
6	The Six Wives of Gallifrey One	February 24–26, 1995	Irvine Radisson Plaza
6	Peter Davison, Philip Segal, John Levene, Nigel Bennett, Harry Harrison		
7	The Seventh Seal of Gallifrey One	February 16–19, 1996	Airtel Plaza Hotel
7	Sylvester McCoy, Sophie Aldred, John Levene, Patricia Tallman, Richard Herd, Aron Eisenberg		
8	Gallifrey One Across the Eighth Dimension	February 14–16, 1997	Airtel Plaza Hotel
8	Anneke Wills, Michael Craze, Philip Segal, Yee Jee Tso, Julie Caitlin Brown, Ed Wasser, Robert Hewitt Wolfe		
9	The Nine Lives of Gallifrey One	February 13–15, 1998	Airtel Plaza Hotel
9	Colin Baker, Deborah Watling, Matthew Waterhouse, Erin Gray, Jeff Conaway, Richard Hatch, Anne Lockhart, Herbert Jefferson, Jr., Stephen R. Donaldson, Dorothy C. Fontana		
10	The Tenth Planet of Gallifrey One	February 12–15, 1999	Airtel Plaza Hotel
10	Nicholas Courtney, Wendy Padbury, Lisa Bowerman, Philip Segal, Daphne Ashbrook, Wayne Alexander, Robin Atkin-Downes, Tucker Smallwood, Casey Biggs		
11	The Eleventh Hour of Gallifrey One	February 18–20, 2000	Airtel Plaza Hotel
11	Peter Davison, Terrance Dicks, Peter Woodward, Bob May, Marc Scott Zicree, Robert Trebor, Carrie Dobro, Michele Scarabelli, Gary Graham		
12	The Twelfth Regeneration of Gallifrey One	February 23–25, 2001	Airtel Plaza Hotel
12	Bonnie Langford, Mark Strickson, Sarah Sutton, India Fisher, Lisa Bowerman, Mira Furlan, Brad Dourif, Daniel Dae Kim, Marjorie Monaghan, Frank Kelly Freas		
13	The Thirteenth Floor of Gallifrey One	February 15–18, 2002	Airtel Plaza Hotel
13	Carole Ann Ford, Anneke Wills, Frazer Hines, Maggie Stables, Gordon Michael Woolvett, Keith Hamilton Cobb, Richard Lynch		
14	Gallifrey One: Episode XIV - The Faction Paradox	February 14–17, 2003	Airtel Plaza Hotel
14	Peter Davison, Colin Baker, India Fisher, Caroline Morris, Virginia Hey, Andrea Thompson, Kathryn Leigh Scott, Marv Wolfman & Len Wein		
15	Gallifrey One's Fifteen Minutes of Fame	February 13–16, 2004	Airtel Plaza Hotel
15	Paul McGann, Sylvester McCoy, Janet Fielding, Yee Jee Tso, India Fisher, Paul Darrow, Susannah Harker, Danny Strong, Robia LaMorte, Stuart Pankin		
16	The Sixteen Swashbucklers of Gallifrey One	February 18–20, 2005	Airtel Plaza Hotel
16	Elisabeth Sladen, Katy Manning, Nicholas Courtney, Richard Franklin, Terrance Dicks, Barry Letts, Robert Shearman, Paul Cornell, Amber Benson, Jack Donner, Toby Longworth		
17	Gallifrey One in the 17th and a Half Century	February 17–19, 2006	Los Angeles Airport Marriott
17	Noel Clarke, Mary Tamm, Louise Jameson, Steven Moffat, Philip Olivier, David Warwick, Pamela Salem, Mark Gatiss, Vaughn Armstrong, Tracy Scoggins, Deanna Lund, Michael Muhney, Natalija Nogulich		
18	The Eighteenth Amendment of Gallifrey One	February 16–18, 2007	Los Angeles Airport Marriott
18	Colin Baker, Caroline John, Eric Roberts, Steven Moffat, Terry Molloy, Maggie Stables, John Levene, Geoffrey Beevers, Bill Mumy, Angela Cartwright, Richard Chaves, France Nuyen, Carol Lynley		
19	Gallifrey One's Nineteenth Symphony: Opus 2008	February 15–17, 2008	Los Angeles Airport Marriott
19	Sylvester McCoy, Sophie Aldred, Steven Moffat, Daphne Ashbrook, Andrew Cartmel, Joel Hodgson, Derek Riddell, James Moran, Moya Brady		
20	Gallifrey One: 20 to Life	February 13–15, 2009	Los Angeles Airport Marriott
20	Phil Collinson, Colin Baker, Nicola Bryant, Wendy Padbury, Frazer Hines, Gareth David-Lloyd, Kai Owen, Naoko Mori, Daphne Ashbrook, Phil Ford, Laura Doddington, Ciara Janson, Claudia Christian, Wendy Pini, Tony Lee, Callum Blue		
21	Gallifrey One: Blackjack 21	February 26–28, 2010	Los Angeles Airport Marriott
21	Katy Manning, Georgia Tennant, Louise Page, Tommy Knight, Graeme Harper, Deborah Watling, Andrew Hayden-Smith, John Levene, Anneke Wills, Frazer Hines, Bob Baker, John Pickard, Colin Teague, Alice Troughton, Pia Guerra, Larry Nemecek, Stephanie Beacham, Tony Lee, Richard Dinnick		
22	Gallifrey One's Catch 22: Islands of Mystery	February 18–20, 2011	Los Angeles Airport Marriott
22	Peter Davison, Janet Fielding, Sarah Sutton, Matthew Waterhouse, John Leeson, John Levene, Frazer Hines, Tracie Simpson, Cush Jumbo, Ian McNeice, Neill Gorton, Rob Mayor, Joss Agnew, Gareth Roberts, Jane Espenson, Doris Egan, James Moran, Paul Kasey, Sarah Douglas, Chase Masterson, Tony Lee, Richard Dinnick		
23	Gallifrey One's Network 23	February 17–19, 2012	Los Angeles Airport Marriott
23	Paul McGann, Camille Coduri, Mark Sheppard, Louise Jameson, Maureen O'Brien, William Russell, Tony Curran, Caitlin Blackwood, Richard Franklin, Daphne Ashbrook, Toby Haynes, W. Morgan Sheppard, Simon Fisher-Becker, Yee Jee Tso, John Shiban, Tony Lee, Richard Dinnick		
24	The 24 Hours of Gallifrey One	February 15–17, 2013	Los Angeles Airport Marriott
24	Freema Agyeman, Sylvester McCoy, Philip Hinchcliffe, Mark Strickson, Peter Purves, Deborah Watling, Ben Browder, Frances Barber, Michael Jayston, Neve McIntosh, Frazer Hines, Nicholas Pegg, Dan Starkey, Neve McIntosh, Ian McNeice, Finn Jones, Ashley Eckstein, Paul Marc Davis, Anjli Mohindra, Gary Russell, Ed Stradling, Richard Dinnick		
25	Gallifrey One: 25 Glorious Years	February 14–16, 2014	Los Angeles Airport Marriott
25	Colin Baker, Billie Piper, Paul McGann, Arthur Darvill, Katy Manning, Nicola Bryant, Mark Sheppard, Gareth Thomas, Jean Marsh, Matthew Waterhouse, Frazer Hines, Deborah Watling, Richard Franklin, John Levene, Tom Price, Annette Badland, David Banks, Deep Roy, Lachele Carl, Stuart Milligan, Dominic Glynn, Velile Tshabalala, Ricco Ross, Paul Cornell, Rob Shearman, Gary Russell, Phil Ford, Ellie Darcey-Alden, Brent Spiner, Greg Weisman, Tony Lee, Richard Dinnick		
26	The 26 Seasons of Gallifrey One	February 13–15, 2015	Los Angeles Airport Marriott
26	John Barrowman, Janet Fielding, Derrick Sherwin, Eve Myles, Carole Ann Ford, Sophie Aldred, Nichelle Nichols, Wendy Padbury, Frazer Hines, Naoko Mori, Burn Gorman, Dan Starkey, Jamie Mathieson, Rachel Talalay, Andrew Cartmel, Bruno Langley, Adjoa Andoh, Terry Molloy, Nicholas Briggs, Colin Spaull, Matthew Jacobs, Jason Connery, Juliet Landau, Alexis Cruz, Gabriel Woolf, Angela Bruce, Garrick Hagon, Christopher Neame, David Gooderson, Robert Picardo, Gary Russell, Tony Lee, Richard Dinnick		
27	Gallifrey One: Station 27	February 12–14, 2016	Los Angeles Airport Marriott
27	John Hurt, Peter Davison, Colin Baker, Michelle Gomez, Ingrid Oliver, Samuel Anderson, Nicola Bryant, Frazer Hines, Clare Higgins, Neve McIntosh, Julian Glover, Patricia Quinn, Ian McNeice, Sarah Dollard, Jamie Mathieson, Jessica Martin, India Fisher, Sarah Douglas, Naoko Mori, Andrew Hayden-Smith, Andy Pryor, Andrew Cartmel, Gary Russell, Paul Cornell, Phil Plait, Michelle Thaller, Simon Guerrier, Nichelle Nichols, Tony Lee, Richard Dinnick		
28	Gallifrey One: 28 Years Later	February 17–19, 2017	Los Angeles Airport Marriott
28	Paul McGann, Lalla Ward, Louise Jameson, Katy Manning, Anneke Wills, Frazer Hines, Philip Hinchcliffe, Catrin Stewart, Roger Murray-Leach, Danny Webb, Jimmy Vee, Peter Purves, Hattie Hayridge, Daphne Ashbrook, John Leeson, Gareth David-Lloyd, Naoko Mori, Prentis Hancock, Simon Fisher-Becker, Mat Irvine, Deep Roy, Michael Troughton, Nicholas Briggs, Nicholas Pegg, Barnaby Edwards, Amy Pemberton, Rachael Stott, Nick Abadzis, Paul Cornell, Ryan Carnes, Anna Shaffer, Christine Adams, Dominic Glynn, Sam Watts, John Peel, Tony Lee, Gary Russell, Richard Dinnick, David Gerrold, Chase Masterson, June Hudson, Howard Burden		
29	The 29 Voyages of Gallifrey One	February 16–18, 2018	Los Angeles Airport Marriott
29	Steven Moffat, Sylvester McCoy, Matt Lucas, Sophie Aldred, David Bradley, Jemma Redgrave, Camille Coduri, Wendy Padbury, Frazer Hines, Murray Gold, Chase Masterson, Lisa Bowerman, Terry Molloy, Brian Minchin, Rona Munro, Robert Shearman, Andrew Cartmel, Jamie Mathieson, Sarah Dollard, Peter Harness, Paul Cornell, Rachel Talalay, Lawrence Gough, Hayley Nebauer, Wayne Yip, Lindsey Alford, Jessica Martin, Stephen Wyatt, Philip Martin, Mike Tucker, Mark Ayres, Chris Achilleos, Jenny Colgan, Carrie Henn, Dee Sadler, Simon Fraser, George Mann, John Dorney, Matt Fitton, Cavan Scott, Jon Davey, Tony Lee, Christopher Jones, Richard Dinnick, Edward Russell, Charlie Ross, Jason Haigh-Ellery, Sue Cowley, Sam Watts		
30	Gallifrey One: 30 Years in the TARDIS	February 15–17, 2019	Los Angeles Airport Marriott
30	Colin Baker, Catherine Tate, William Russell, Carole Ann Ford, John Barrowman, Nicola Bryant, Katy Manning, Frazer Hines, Richard Franklin, Tim Treloar, Lisa Greenwood, Caitlin Blackwood, Michael Jayston, Jacob Dudman, Tony Curan, Nicholas Briggs, Paul Cornell, Yasmin Bannerman, Rachel Talalay, Jamie Childs, Wayne Yip, Ben Wheatley, Sarah Dollard, Chase Masterson, Simon Guerrier, Rob Ritchie, Rachael Stott, Alex Paknadel, Scott Handcock, Tony Lee, Richard Dinnick, Mark Ayres, Blair Mowat, Sam Watts, Richard Ashton, Jon Davey, Mickey Lewis, Lisa McMullin, James Peaty, Rob William, Alex Paknadel, Rachael Scott, Jody Houser, Rosie Jane, Rusty Goffe, Lance Parkin, Nick Robatto, Sophie Hopkins, Claudia Christian, Stuart Manning, Chris Chapman, Steve Roberts, Paul Vanezis, Richard Molesworth, Christopher Jones, Mira Furlan, Patricia Tallman, Bruce Boxleitner, Walter Koenig, Gigi Edgley, Edward Russell, Jason Haigh-Ellery, Sue Cowley		
31	The 31 Flavours of Gallifrey One	February 14–16, 2020	Los Angeles Airport Marriott
31	Christopher Eccleston, Peter Davison, Pearl Mackie, Tosin Cole, Michelle Ryan, Janet Fielding, Sarah Sutton, Mark Strickson, Frazer Hines, Joy Wilkinson, Vinay Patel, Pete McTighe, Michael E. Briant, Margot Hayhoe, Sallie Aprahamian, Steffan Morris, Anjli Mohindra, Geoffrey Beevers, Tilly Steele, Mark Dexter, Anna-Louise Plowman, Tracie Simpson, Michael Collins, James DeHaviland, Mark McQuoid, Mark Corden, Scott Gray, Una McCormack, Emma Reeves, Gary Russell, Rhianne Starbuck, Gigi Edgley, Peter Anghelides, Vaughn Armstrong, Richard Ashton, Keith Barnfather, Julie Benson, Shawna Benson, Hayden Black, Bill Blair, Nicole De Boer, Brannon Braga, Matty Cardarople, Cherry Chevapravatdumrong, Jessie Christiansen, Jeffrey Combs, Paul Cornell, Sue Cowley, Jon Davey, Richard Dinnick, Matt Fitton, David Gerrold, Marcus Gilbert, Shari Goodhartz, David A. Goodman, Jason Haigh-Ellery, Barbara Hambly, Philip Hopkins, Gillian Horvath, Jody Houser, David J Howe, Samantha Howe, Christopher Jones, Collin Kelly, Jackson Lanzing, Tony Lee, Erin Maher, Chase Masterson, Sarah Milkovich, Bob Miller, Craig Miller, Russell Minton, Anthony Montgomery, Daniel Keys Moran, Robert Napton, Larry Nemecek, Robert O'Reilly, Dan Peck, Wendi Pini, Suzie Plakson, Trina Ray, Kay Reindl, Matt Rohman, Arthur Sellers, Dr. Anita Sengupta, Blair Shedd, Richard Starkings, Arne Starr, Kim Steadman, David Tipton, Denton Tipton, Scott Tipton, Connor Trinneer, Sam Watts, Marv Wolfman, JK Woodward.		
32	Gallifrey One: Thirty-Second to Midnight	February 18–20, 2022	Los Angeles Airport Marriott
32	Sylvester McCoy, Mandip Gill, Jo Martin, Sacha Dhawan, Matt Strevens, Frazer Hines, Jonathan Watson, Eric Roberts, Sophia Myles, Tommy Knight, Anjli Mohindra, Bhavnisha Parmar, Michael Jayston, Stephen Gallagher, India Fisher, Sadie Miller, Christopher Naylor, Lauren Cornelius, Clem So, Mickey Lewis, Jon Davey, Colin Spaull, Gigi Edgley, Dominic Keating, Andrew Robinson, Chase Masterson, Jody Houser, Lisa McMullin, Robert Mukes, Tony Lee, Gary Russell, Paul Cornell, Matthew Sweet, John Peel, Matt Fitton, Mark Corden, Rob Ritchie, Jason Haigh-Ellery, Martin Geraghty, Emily Cook, Heather Challands, David J. Howe, Samantha Howe, Jo Osmond, Eliza Roberts, Eli Jane, Susanna Malak, Criag Miller, Gillian Horvatch, Richard Starkings, Scott Tipton, Robert Napton, Trina Ray, Sarah Milkovich, Kim Steadman, Krys Blackwood, Anita Sengupta, Jessie Christiansen, Travis Richey.		
33	Gallifrey One 33 1/3: Long Live The Revolution	February 17–19, 2023	Los Angeles Airport Marriott
33	Jodie Whittaker, Colin Baker, Bonnie Langford, Chris Chibnall, Janet Fielding, Sophie Aldred, Katy Manning, Wendy Padbury, Frazer Hines, John Culshaw, Michael Troughton, Daniel Anthony, Craige Els, Jaime Magnus Stone, Arwel Wyn Jones, Dafydd Shurmer, Tim Treloar, Stephen Noonan, Daisy Ashford, Lauren Cornelius, Jeff Cummins, Richard Price, Simon Carew, Tim Dane Reid, Mickey Lewis, Chase Masterson, Gigi Edgley, Dan Slott, Gary Russell, Matthew Sweet, Joseph Lidster, Tony Lee, Paul Cornell, Peter Anghelides, Matt Fitton, Jody Houser, Simon Guerrier, Lisa McMullin, Lizbeth Myles, Kenny Smith, Rob Ritchie, Matthew Jacobs, Vanessa Yuille, David Howe, Samantha Howe, Christopher Jones, Blair Shedd, Jason Haigh-Ellery, Laurette Spang, Sarah Rush, Eric Pierpoint, Casey Biggs, Ben Browder, Joe Flanigan, Alaina Huffman, David Gerrold, Marv Wolfman, Barbara Hambly, Julie Benson, Shawna Benson, Cherry Chevapravatdumrong, Javi Grillo-Marxuach, Lizzie Worsdell, Dominic Martin, Emily Davis, Dan Peck, Gillian Horvath, Trina Ray, Kim Steadman, Sarah Milkovich, Anita Sengupta, Jessie Christiansen, Robert Napton, Craig Miller, Larry Nemecek, Bill Blair		
34	Gallifrey One's Miracle on 34th Street	February 16–18, 2024	Los Angeles Airport Marriott
34	Sir Derek Jacobi, Billie Piper, Alex Kingston, Segun Akinola, Matthew Waterhouse, Frazer Hines, Camille Coduri, Jacqueline King, Rachel Talalay, Ray Holman, Brian Herring, Shaun Dingwall, Annette Badland, Eric Roberts, Jaye Griffiths, Sally Knyvette, Brian Croucher, Jan Chappell, Jonathon Carley, Kevin Jon Davies, Dominic Glynn, Robert Strange, Gigi Edgley, Chase Masterson, Stephen Cole, Mark Morris, James Goss, Esmie Jikiemi-Pearson, John Dorney, Gary Russell, Lisa McMullin, Tony Lee, Jody Houser, Paul Cornell, Peter Anghelides, Simon Guerrier, Lizbeth Myles, Alfie Shaw, Jason Haigh-Ellery, David Gerrold, Barbara Hambly, Gareth Kavanagh, Ian Winterton, Julie Benson, Shawna Benson, Cherry Chevapravatdumrong, Gillian Horvath, Christopher Jones, Dan Peck, Keith Barnfather, Trina Ray, Kim Steadman, Sarah Milkovich, Krys Blackwood, Anita Sengupta, George Shaw, David Raiklen, Scott Tipton, Sandra Gimpel, Robert Napton, Craig Miller, Eliza Roberts, Susanna Malak, Brad & Christine Galey, Rory Ross, Eyad Elbitar, Warren Proulx, Larry Nemecek, Travis Richey.		
35	Gallifrey One In 35 Millimetre	February 14–16, 2025	Los Angeles Airport Marriott
35	Colin Baker, Sylvester McCoy, Catherine Tate, Jenna Coleman, Julie Gardner, Steven Moffat, Joel Collins, Katy Manning, Susan Twist, Kate Herron, Briony Redman, Julie Anne Robinson, Frazer Hines, David Gooderson, Alex Macqueen, Louise Jameson, Nicola Bryant, Jody Houser, Tony Lee, Nigel Fairs, Wendy Padbury, Miles Richardson, Lizzie Hopley, Paul Magrs, Jonathan Morris, Gary Russell, Scott Handcock, Charlie Hayes, John Dorney, Andy Lane, Andrew Smith, Nev Fountain, Michelle Greenidge, Mark Sheppard, Safiyya Ingar, Juliet Landau, Mara Wilson, Alimi Ballard, Marv Wolfman, Barbara Hambly, Anita Sengupta, Gigi Edgley, Diane Franklin, Cherry Cheva, Sarah Milkovich, Craig Miller, Darin Henry, Ursula Burton, Christopher Jones, Carl Held, Lisa McMullin, Alfie Shaw, Jason Haigh-Ellery, Séan Carlsen, Blair Mowat, Philip Rhys Chaudhary, Trina Ray, Kim Steadman, Krys Blackwood, Lizzie Worsdell, Blair Shedd, Rossa McPhillips, Ben Tedds, Darren Jones, Dan Peck, Scott Tipton, Robert Napton, Ardeshir Radpour, Daniel Bohman, Travis Richey.		
36	The 36 Legends of Gallifrey One: Stories Untold	February 6–8, 2026	Los Angeles Airport Marriott
36	Peter Davison, Paul McGann, Millie Gibson, Janet Fielding, Anita Dobson, Daphne Ashbrook, Yee Jee Tso, Steph de Whalley.		
