= Science Fiction South Africa =

For the South Australian Doctor Who Fan Club, Inc/SFSA, see Doctor Who in Australia.

Science Fiction and Fantasy South Africa (SFFSA) is the oldest science fiction society in South Africa. It was founded in 1969. The society publishes its own fanzine, called Probe, on a quarterly basis. It sponsors an annual short story writing competition, called the "Nova Short Story Competition"; and holds small annual science fiction conventions. Due to the geographical isolation of South Africa, much of SFSA's contact with the rest of science fiction fandom is not in person, but through the mails and electronically, although some SFSA members have attended conventions in other countries
