= Wolkowicz =

Wołkowicz is a Polish language surname, a Polonized form of the Belarusian surname Volkovich. Notable people with the surname include:

- Krzysztof Wołkowicz
- Bronisław Wołkowicz
- Bruno Wolkowitch
- Eugeniusz Wołkowicz
- Gail Wolkowicz
- Lucianne Walkowicz
- Tomasz Wołkowicz
