= Volkovich =

Volkovich is a Russian-language surname of Ruthenian (historical Belarusian) origin, also adopted by Ashkenazi Jews. The Polonized form is Wolkowicz, Ukrainian: Vovkovych (Вовкович ). Modern Belarusian: Vawkovich/Vaukovich, transliterated from Russian: Valkovich. Notable people with the surname include:

- Daniil Volkovich, Soviet Belarusian statesman and politician
- Vladyslav Volkovich, a murderer from the Ukrainian Nighttime Killers group
- Alexey Volkovich (1856–1924) Russian politician
