= From the Doctor to My Son Thomas =

2014 viral video recorded by actor Peter Capaldi

- Peter Capaldi in an excerpt from his video
- Written by: Peter Capaldi
- Starring: Peter Capaldi
- Distributed by: Ross Goodall (YouTube)
- Release date: 6 November 2014
- Running time: 42 seconds
- Country: Scotland
- Language: English

"From the Doctor to My Son Thomas" is a viral video recorded by actor Peter Capaldi and sent to Thomas Goodall, an autistic nine-year-old boy in England, to console the child over grief from the death of Goodall's grandmother. Capaldi filmed the 42-second video in character as the Twelfth Doctor from the BBC science-fiction series Doctor Who. Capaldi's message had a positive effect on Thomas: he smiled for the first time since learning of his grandmother's death, and gained the courage to go to her funeral.

Thomas's father Ross Goodall posted the video to YouTube on 6 November 2014, wanting to make the video available to his family, but had no idea it would become popular online. The video was viewed over 200,000 times in its first 48 hours online, and more than doubled the next day, and less than a week later it had over 900,000 total views, making it a viral video, with the responses becoming a global phenomenon.

"From the Doctor to My Son Thomas" was widely praised by critics for its emotional resonance. The Independent wrote that Capaldi displayed a kinder face of his personality by sending the message. It was hailed as Capaldi's best contribution as the character of the Doctor to date, with him making effective use of his Doctor role. The video had a positive impact on those with mental health problems. Peter Harness, writer of the episode "Kill the Moon", said that Capaldi's video was his favourite highlight from ten years of Doctor Who.

== Background ==
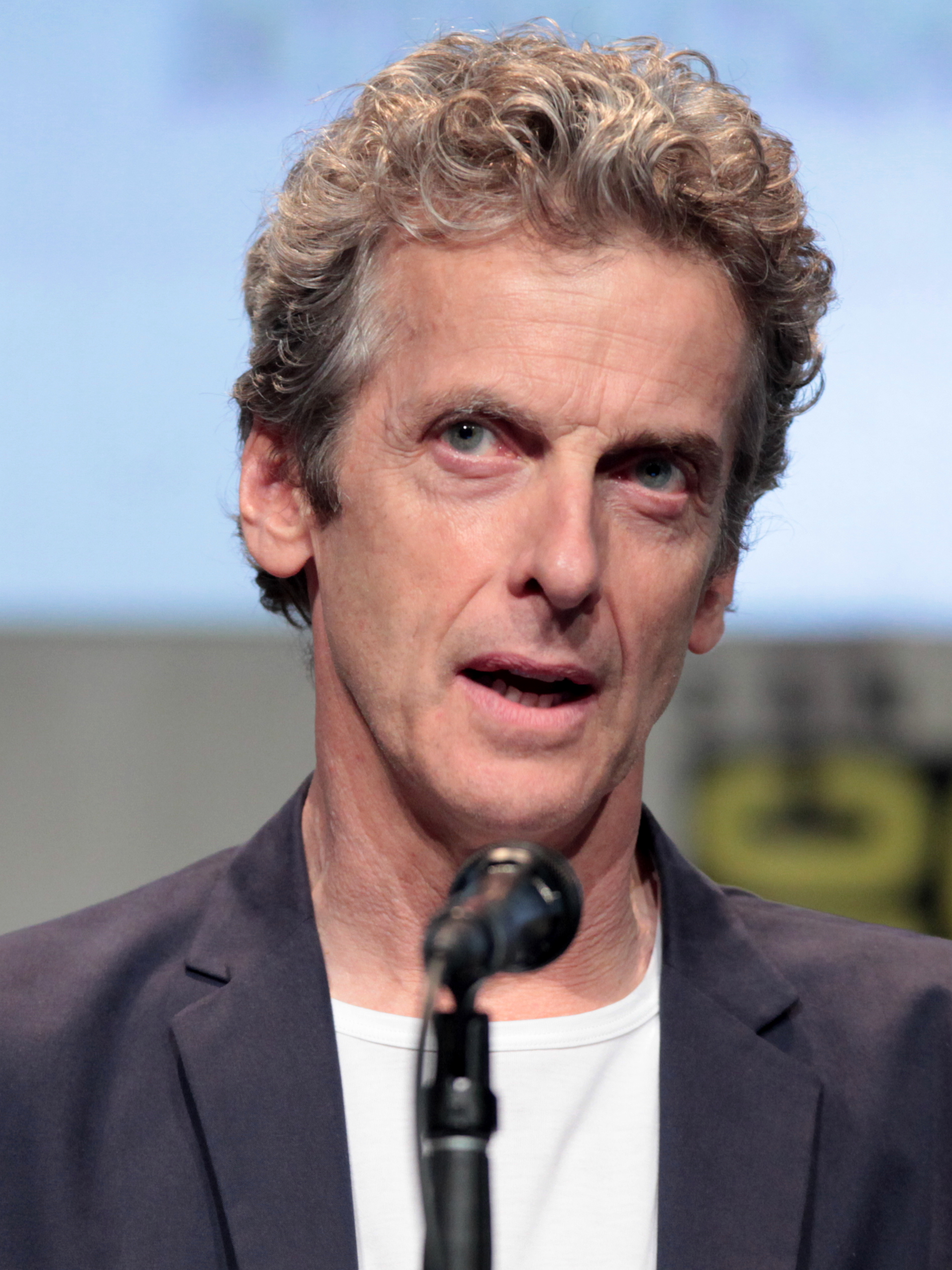
Peter Capaldi in 2015

Scottish actor and film director Peter Capaldi was cast in 2013 as the twelfth incarnation of the Doctor (Note: Within the series' narrative, the Doctor is a time travelling, humanoid alien from a race known as the Time Lords. When the Doctor is critically injured, he can regenerate his body, and in doing so gain a new physical appearance, and with it a distinct new personality; this plot mechanism has allowed the Doctor to be portrayed by a series of actors over the decades since the programme's inception in 1963.) in the BBC science-fiction series Doctor Who. His casting was announced on 4 August 2013, and Capaldi first appeared as the Doctor in a cameo in the 50th anniversary special "The Day of the Doctor", before appearing in the 2013 Christmas special "The Time of the Doctor". A lifelong fan of the series, Capaldi had played Lobus Caecilius in the 2008 episode "The Fires of Pompeii" and a civil servant, John Frobisher, in the 2009 spin-off Torchwood: Children of Earth. Before taking the role, Capaldi said that he had to seriously consider the increased visibility that would come with the part. He said in an interview with Entertainment Weekly that he had been invited to audition for the role of the Eighth Doctor in 1995 before the production of the 1996 TV film, but did not go because he was unsure if he would get the part and did not wish to be part of a large group of actors turned down for the role.

Thomas Goodall, from North Baddesley in Hampshire, had been a devoted fan of Doctor Who since the age of two and wrote a letter to Capaldi saying he hoped the actor found success in his new role portraying the Doctor. The Goodall family were all fans of Doctor Who, describing themselves as Whovians. Thomas decorated his home with objects related to the television series. Capaldi wrote back to Thomas thanking him, and sent a note to the child's father Ross Goodall saying that he intended to send a video message. Capaldi enclosed guidance to Ross on how to organise a tour of the production studios for Doctor Who. Ross subsequently communicated with Capaldi through the actor's agent, to inform him that Thomas's grandmother had died. (Helen, aged 72, died in early October 2014.) He told Capaldi that his son was not dealing well with the grief from his grandmother's death. The family received the subsequent video message to Thomas from Capaldi three weeks after the death of the child's grandmother.

== Video message ==
Capaldi appears in character as the Doctor and addresses Thomas directly, greeting him by name. He expresses his gratitude at receiving the child's letter, saying that it had pleased him. He then speaks to Thomas about grief, mentioning the Doctor's adventures with travelling companion Clara Oswald. He tells Thomas that negative events impact Clara and himself in their journeys through the universe and time travel, and that occasionally they feel depressed too. The Doctor tells Thomas that he is glad the child is supporting him in his adventures. Capaldi concludes the 42-second video message by wishing Thomas to experience joy, and encourages the youth to be well and remain positive.

== Family response and release ==
The family received the video from Capaldi on 3 November 2014. After viewing the video, Thomas felt encouraged to attend his grandmother's funeral. In an interview with The Guardian, Ross Goodall explained that Capaldi's mention of sadness resonated with the child due to his experience of grief over his grandmother's death. He discussed the manner in which Thomas perceived emotions as a strict dichotomy between positive and negative without a middle ground. Thomas interpreted from the video that it was all right to feel happy while simultaneously acknowledging that a sad event had occurred. Ross Goodall told The Guardian that before viewing the video from Capaldi, his son had not wanted to attend the funeral.

The boy's mother said that the video had helped him to deal with his depression. After watching Capaldi's message, Ross Goodall stated that his son's behaviour patterns changed markedly. This change included the ability to comfort his sister and step out of his day-to-day routine. Ross Goodall said that after watching the video, his son smiled for the first time since his grandmother's death. The family framed the letter from Capaldi that came before the video message, and Ross Goodall said that Thomas looked at it when he felt distressed.

Ross Goodall later uploaded the message from Capaldi to the video-sharing website YouTube on 6 November 2014. He commented at the video's YouTube location that he was surprised at the online response, and that at the time of initial posting was unaware it would become viral. He later explained that he had uploaded it only to share it with family members on completion of the memorial services for Thomas's grandmother. Thomas's father wrote that the video greatly affected his son, and enabled him to cope with grief and feel comforted. He praised Capaldi for his kind act and explained that the video improved his son's mental well-being throughout the ordeal.

== Reception ==
CNN reported that after its appearance on YouTube, the video had over 200,000 views in its first 48 hours of availability. BBC News noted that by the next day, it had received over 500,000 views, and by 10 November 2014 it had over 750,000. The Washington Post noted that by the next day the view count was above 900,000. Multiple publications observed that Capaldi's message had become a viral video. ITV News called online reaction to the video a global phenomenon. By 10 November 2014, total comments by viewers posted below the video on YouTube numbered in the hundreds. The majority of comments were supportive. Visitors to the site wrote favourably of Capaldi's actions to record the video for the child.

"... this unique performance may well be his most admirable adventure yet."

— BT

The Guardian called the recording by Capaldi a touching video tribute. CNN characterised the video similarly, as did Digital Spy, ITV News, TV 3, and publications in Spanish and Dutch. The Barcelona newspaper La Vanguardia wrote that Capaldi's video was an example of bringing joy into someone's life through a small act. The Washington Post called it a touching message. The Daily Dot described the video as inspirational. The Independent contrasted Capaldi's portrayal of the 12th Doctor as one of the darker incarnations of the character with his kinder message as the same character in the video. MTV called Capaldi a most wonderful person for his act, and concluded that the video was quite endearing.

The Daily Telegraph described the video as a moving inspiration to a child suffering from grief. The Huffington Post wrote that if they were able to engage in time travel themselves, they would be unable to encounter a kinder tale. Io9 appreciated that Capaldi was using his celebrity status to effect positive change through his portrayal of the character, and praised his use of the fictional role as a force for public good. The South Wales Evening Post noted that Capaldi had appeared in a brief video as himself congratulating a bride on her wedding, and wrote that this video was more impressive than the previous appearance. Metro commented "Just when you thought Peter Capaldi couldn't possibly get any cooler, he's gone and outdone himself with this video."

== Impact ==
International Business Times reported that the video message had a significant impact on the child, in spite of its brevity, and noted in a follow-up piece that Capaldi's video was featured in headlines of multiple newspapers. Digital Spy followed up on its earlier favourable coverage of Capaldi's video, and chose it as the number one entry out of "7 awesome celebrity moments that will melt your heart". Hollywood Life said that their journalists were moved to tears after watching the video. Their review concluded that Capaldi's message was both kind and strong, and that it was intelligent of the actor to compare the grief of Thomas to that encountered by his character on the television programme.

Capaldi's actions received favourable coverage from the Autism Daily Newscast, an official Google News website reporting on current events and news of interest to those on the autism spectrum, with site journalist Jo Worgan noting that the actor had devoted himself while on the set of Doctor Who to spending time with an autistic girl who was a fan of the show. The Hollywood Reporter stressed that, while in the context of the Doctor Who program, the Doctor usually protected the entire universe from harm, this video was striking because it showed that the character cared equally about the mental well-being of a single child.

In a March 2015 interview with Radio Times, Peter Harness, writer of Doctor Who episode "Kill the Moon", cited the video by Capaldi as his favourite highlight from the last ten years of the television programme. Harness explained his decision, saying that the video demonstrated Capaldi's kind demeanour and illustrated that Doctor Who served to assist youngsters in learning about the travails of greater society. He said that, by extension, it reminded all viewers to act with more compassion towards one another.

== See also ==
- Doctor Who (series 8)
- Global perceptions of autism
- Societal and cultural aspects of autism
- Whoniverse
