= Doctor Puppet =

Animated Doctor Who fan films

Doctor Puppet (also known as "The Doctor Puppet") was a series of US/UK stop-motion-animated fan films inspired by the BBC science fiction program Doctor Who. The series was first created by Alisa Stern in 2012 in her New York apartment.

== Basic information ==
Doctor Puppet consists of a Tumblr blog. The series has featured the Eleventh Doctor, the Twelfth Doctor, Clara Oswald and other characters. Productions have included eight episodes, three Christmas specials, music videos, behind the scenes documentaries and Google Hangouts with the creative team. The series was composed and narrated by the UK film score composer Scott Ampleford.

== History ==
Following the creation of the Doctor Puppet Tumblr blog, which features pictures of the puppets around America and Europe, Alisa and her team created the first animated Christmas special for YouTube "How the Doctor Puppet Saved Christmas". This was narrated by Sean Li, before Scott Ampleford took on this role for the main series. Catching the attention of Nerdist Industries, Alisa was invited to air Doctor Puppet Episode 1 The Red X short on their YouTube channel in March 2013.

In August 2014, Doctor Puppet was invited to script and animate a 20-second scene for the BBC America documentary Doctor Who: Earth Conquest featuring the voices of original actors Peter Capaldi (the Twelfth Doctor) and Jenna Coleman (Clara Oswald), playing themselves as tourists in New York. This was animated by Erin Natal and was featured alongside an interview with creator Alisa Stern on the Series 8 DVD boxset of Doctor Who. The main members of the Doctor Puppet team travelled from New York and the UK to Dragon Con in Atlanta to speak on several animation panels and preview Episode 6 to their fans.

In October 2014, Doctor Puppet raised $16,015 via their Indiegogo campaign in order to fund their 2014 Christmas special.

In 2015, Doctor Puppet, honored the remaining Indiegogo photo perks and completing the eight episode story arc featuring the Eleventh Doctor before moving onto further stories with the Twelfth Doctor and Clara.

== Media attention ==
Online
Alisa Stern and the team regularly promote their activities and interact with their fanbase via their Twitter account, Facebook page and Tumblr blog. They have received positive online media attention including featured articles on BBC America, Toybox, Kasterborous - a Doctor Who UK Webzine, Huffington Post, io9, Tor, Skwigly, The Mary Sue and SYFY WIRE.

In Print
Doctor Puppet has been featured twice in the BBC Doctor Who Magazine; in Issue 480 on page 12 in the WhoTube column promoting Episode 6 and, in December 2014, a full page feature on page 79 of the Doctor Who Magazine Special: The 2015 Yearbook.

Podcasts
Extensive Google Hangout video podcasts have been posted via Google+/YouTube - Part 1 and Part 2 in December 2013, which was the first time the creative team had "met" each other as a whole team. They also recorded A Christmas Special Hangout in January 2014 discussing behind the scenes with the new Twelfth Doctor puppet.
In 2014, Alisa Stern and Erin Natal were featured guests on the Earth Station One podcasts no. 80 (reviewing the Doctor Who episode Time Heist) and no. 91 (reviewing the 2014 special Last Christmas). The two podcasts helped promote Doctor Puppet's Indiegogo campaign and then celebrate the success of The Planet That Came For Christmas giving behind the scenes information about the origins of the storyline. Host Mike Faber called the Doctor Puppet special "very entertaining" with a "very well rounded story" which "flowed really nicely". Alisa and Scott were also featured guests on Who's Talking: A Doctor Who Podcast no. 9 in October 2014, in which they promoted the Indiegogo campaign and discussed the Season 8 episode Flatline. On 12 January 2019, Alisa was interviewed about Doctor Puppet on Episode 115 of the Roundabout Creative Chaos Podcast.
In 2018 she was interviewed by Galactic YoYo Podcast.

== Music ==
Scott Ampleford's original music reflects the music found in the different eras of Doctor Who including classic electronics in the style of BBC Radiophonic Workshop, 1980s FM and modular synthesizers, and more modern orchestral music in the style of Murray Gold. Initially, the music was composed using sample libraries but since Episode 3 The Doctor in the Garden the soundtracks have included an increasing number of live instruments performed by Scott Ampleford, Phil Toms, student musicians from Colchester Institute and professional musicians such as violinist Steve Bingham. Orchestrator Phil Toms works with Scott on the music to adapt and prepare printed parts for the live musicians, who are often multi-tracked to give the impression of a larger orchestra and choir. Music documentaries on the Doctor Puppet YouTube channel include The Making of the Doctor Puppet Part 3 - Settling the Score and Part 5 - Settling the Score of A Timelord Christmas which give an insight into the creative process for Scott and his team.

Lyrics for A Timelord Christmas by Scott Ampleford
It's a Timelord Christmas
Let the Universe rejoice
It's a Timelord Christmas
For all the girls and boys
We've filled our hearts with warmth and joy
We've built up all year long
When it comes to loving fellow man
Two hearts are better than one
Forwards
We are looking forwards
And we are looking backwards
Reflecting
Merry Christmas one and all!

Radio Castellan EP
For Episode 5 Baker's Eleven, Scott wrote and performed three original tracks which were briefly featured in the soundtrack. Each song features numerous Doctor Who references and are performed by fictitious 1980s bands paying homage to new wave music and specifically Huey Lewis and the News. These were produced by Doug Cairns and featured some of the musicians who play on the main soundtracks, notably Oliver Pashby-Taylor on trumpet and Tom Presland on electric guitar. This EP is available on Scott's Bandcamp site.
Track listing:
1. Theta-Sigma "Zero Room"
2. Delta & The Bannermen "The Happiness Patrol"
3. The Pharos Project "Shada"

The Planet That Came For Christmas
During the score-writing process in December 2014, Scott recorded 40 vocal parts himself as The All Scott Ampleford Male Voice Choir before adding a female choir to the soundtrack. Live woodwind and brass parts were recorded to replace the sampled demo tracks. Scott conducted the Bingham String Quartet with Phil Toms on double bass in an old church near Cambridge, UK. They were recorded five times to simulate a 25 piece string section. Music producer Doug Cairns was brought in to edit, mix and master the final recordings due to the time pressures of composing, arranging and recording the score whilst the finishing touches were being crafted on the animation and VFX. The German lyrics for this Christmas special were taken from a traditional carol Leise rieselt der Schnee with pronunciation guidance from Mike Richter although the lyrics were re-ordered to fit the storyline. The use of these lyrics enhanced the homage to German Expressionism (including jagged set design, camera shots and animated puppet movements) based on films such as The Cabinet of Dr. Caligari (1920) and Nosferatu (1922). This is reflected in the animated films of Tim Burton and so Scott's music pays homage to the soundtracks of Danny Elfman who regularly works with Burton.

German Lyric	English Translation
Leise rieselt der Schnee	The snow falls quietly
Still und starr liegt der See	Silent and still lies the lake
Sorge des Lebens verhallt	Worries in life disappear
Weihnachtlich glänzet der Wald	Christmas shines over the woods
In den Herzen ist's warm	There is warmth in our hearts
Still schweigt Kummer und Harm	Free from sorrow and grief
Bald ist Heilige Nacht	Soon is Christmas night
Chor der Engel erwacht	The choir of angels awake
Horch’ nur wie lieblich es schallt	Listen how lovely it sounds
Sorge des lebens verhallt	Worries in life disappear

== Creative team ==
- Alisa Stern founded Doctor Puppet and produces, writes the scripts, makes the puppets, and contributes animation and props.
- Scott Ampleford came aboard to compose the score for the 2012 Christmas special, but ended up contributing a whole lot more to the series. He narrates, writes, and lends his Doctor Who expertise especially for the Classic era Doctors. His voice has been mistaken for that of Tom Baker, Paul McGann, and Richard E. Grant by fans.
- Rachel Gitlevich is a versatile animation pro who single-handedly animated the puppets in the first two episodes and has animated on all subsequent films. She has also painted backgrounds, storyboarded, and made props, including all the miniature food and Doctor Who symbolic cupcakes/fairycakes.
- Erin Natal joined for the 2013 Christmas special which she storyboarded and animated. Since then, she has animated nearly all of the Twelfth Doctor videos and has been a creative force behind his development. She has also storyboarded each subsequent Doctor Puppet video since the 2013 Christmas special.
- Shelby Arnold has been making props and solving technical problems since the 2012 Christmas special. She figured out how to make the Fourth Doctor's TARDIS console function.
- Amanda Zoe has sewn puppet costumes since the fourth episode. She squeezed all the details of the Sixth Doctor's coat into just a few square inches of fabric.
- Isam S. Prado has been painting backgrounds since the first episode and occasionally creating 3D animation for the series. He also painted the series poster.
- Phil Toms, a UK based music lecturer and professional musician, orchestrated the scores for live instruments and has played the double bass for the soundtracks.
- Arjun G. Sheth has designed the sound effects and Foley for the episodes.
- Doug Cairns produced the audio mix of the Christmas special and the Radio Castellan EP.

== Main filmography ==
Name	First Shown	Length	Synopsis
How the Doctor Puppet Saved Christmas	December 2012	2:53	The Doctor saves New York from a mystery snow storm so Christmas isn't cancelled.
Episode 1 The Red X	March 2013	2:28	The Doctor finds a strange note on his TARDIS that leads him on a mysterious adventure. Who will he meet along the way?
Episode 2 The Conjunction of Eleven	March 2013	2:34	The Doctor discovers that the mystery of the letter is much bigger than he imagined, and might involve some unexpected characters.
Episode 3 The Doctor in the Garden	May 2013	3:02	The Doctor travels into his own past to make sure it's still safe.
Episode 4 Smoke and Mirrors	August 2013	3:00	The Doctor finds a familiar enemy in a strange place.
Episode 5 Baker's Eleven	November 2013	3:50	The Doctor follows a clue and finds something nice.
The Doctor Puppet Dances - A Music Video Tribute to Doctor Who	November 2013	4:04	Music video written and performed by Scott Ampleford, directed by Caden Elliott.
A Timelord Christmas	December 2013	1:58	Doctors Nine, Ten, Eleven and Twelve feature in a Christmas musical number.
Shada - The Pharos Project Live!	January 2014	2:56	Music video written and performed by Scott Ampleford
Happy Birthday Peter Capaldi	April 2014	0:56	The Doctor Puppet team wishes the Doctor himself, Peter Capaldi, a very happy birthday by animating his own Doctor Who fan art!
Doctor Puppet Episode 6 Teaser Trailer	May 2014	0:14	Teaser trailer paying homage to the BBC Teaser trailer
Look! - Doctor Puppet Teaser Trailer	July 2014	0:17	Doctor Puppet makes a grand return in August!
Striking Twelve - A Doctor Puppet Welcome to the Twelfth Doctor	August 2014	0:36	The Twelfth Doctor Puppet makes a timely appearance just before Peter Capaldi debuts on Doctor Who.
Episode 6 The Sign of Four	September 2014	4:25	The Doctor makes a mistake but finds himself in a familiar setting.
The Planet That Came For Christmas	December 2014	5:26	The Twelfth Doctor and Clara embark on a mysterious Christmas adventure.
Episode 7 The Forgone Storm	Published on 29 Feb 2016	5:00	Trapped in a storm, the doctor meets his oldest incarnations...
The 12 Doctors of Christmas	December 2016	2:05	A musical inspired by the carol 12 days of Christmas
Thanks for the stars- a 12th doctor tribute	December 2018	1:15	A tribute to Peter Capaldi whose last episode (Twice Upon a Time) was airing at the time.
Episode 8 The Twelfth Planet	Published on 1 Oct 2018	9:49	The 12th doctor summons all his incarnations to save him from being pulled into a tear in space in an epic finale.
See The Light	29 July 2019	8:31	The original ending to doctor puppet - adapted as a short audio book.

== Future ==
On 1 August 2019 Stern announced "Sum of its parts". A short film of creatures in the woods dancing to music. It was also revealed that this would not be released on YouTube but on film festivals. It was later announced on an indiegogo article on christmas 2019 that the film was finished.

On 30 May 2021, Stern announced on Twitter "Posted No Hunting", a stop motion animated horror film. The film was finished in June 2021 and would also be released through film festivals.
