= Doctor Who in Australia =

Aspect of the series's broadcast history

Doctor Who in Australia refers to the history and culture surrounding the British Broadcasting Corporation science fiction programme Doctor Who since its first broadcast in Australia in January 1965.

The Australian Broadcasting Commission (ABC) was one of the first and longest term purchasers of the series from the BBC, initially planning its Australian debut for May 1964, only six months after the UK premiere. In 1979 the ABC organised a nationwide promotional tour by then-current Doctor Tom Baker and, in 1983, it co-funded the 20th anniversary special "The Five Doctors". In October 2022, the ABC announced it had lost the rights to new episodes of the series, ending an association with the series that had spanned almost 60 years.

Australia was also a key market for the many products licensed by BBC Enterprises and the success of the series in Australia was an important factor in its worldwide penetration; English-speaking countries in the Asia-Pacific region generally bought whatever episodes the ABC had cleared for its own use, and BBC Enterprises' office for the entire region was in Sydney and dealt with the censors and marketing.

== Broadcast history ==
=== The 1960s ===
Doctor Who was first broadcast in Australia by the ABC's Perth station, ABW-2, on Tuesday 12 January 1965. The ABC had intended to begin broadcasting the series in April 1964, but had been forced to delay it because censors had classified the first three Doctor Who serials as suitable for adults only. During this era, the ABC often had to make cuts to Doctor Who episodes to make them suitable for early evening general viewing broadcast, although some serials, such as Mission to the Unknown and The Daleks' Master Plan, were not transmitted at all due to not being able to be suitably edited. The cuts made to William Hartnell and Patrick Troughton-era stories would later prove to be significant for the series' legacy, as for some of the serials that were subsequently wiped by the BBC, the removed material by Australian censors is the only footage of the stories still in existence.

=== The 1970s ===
In Sydney in 1975, the ABC screened just fourteen weekly instalments of Doctor Who – The Time Warrior, Death to the Daleks and The Monster of Peladon – between March and June. These were the first episodes to be broadcast by the ABC in colour. (Due to the BBC's accidental wiping of the master tape of Invasion of the Dinosaurs' first episode, that story was not screened at all by the ABC until November 1984, when they simply broadcast it – without any preceding explanation – as a five-part story, starting from episode 2. They never actually broadcast the full six episode story until 2004). In 1976, the ABC considered no longer broadcasting the series due to low ratings; however, partly because of fan protests, management changed its mind and kept the series on air. Doctor Who was broadcast regularly on the ABC from 1978 to the early 1990s.

=== The 1980s ===
The period from 1978 through to the late 1980s saw the ABC continue to strip Doctor Who in an early-evening weekday timeslot; typically it was Monday-Thursday or Monday–Friday, at either 6:00 or 6:30 pm. During this era, the series would almost always screen throughout the year and, more often than not, it was paired with another program at 6:00pm, most notably The Goodies. In February 1986, the ABC broadcast repeats of The Mind Robber and The Krotons, the first time that black and white Doctor Who serials had been broadcast on the network following its adoption of colour broadcasting in 1975. The regular repeats of Doctor Who on the ABC contrasted with the situation in the UK where the BBC would only broadcast a select number of repeats, generally one or two serials from the most recently concluded season over the summer break.

On 31 October 1988, stripped weekday transmissions of new episodes of Doctor Who recommenced, with the show now in the 5:30 pm timeslot and broadcast under the umbrella of the children's magazine-style program The Afternoon Show, starting with Sylvester McCoy's debut in Time and the Rani, almost fourteen months after it first screened on BBC1. After Season 24 finished, as a gesture to fans in recognition of Doctor Who's 25th anniversary, the ABC also screened the first story of Season 25, Remembrance of the Daleks, only a little more than a month since its UK debut. Apparently, The Afternoon Show's host, James Valentine, was influential in getting this serial added to the ABC's broadcast run. Three of the four episodes were preceded by a Doctor Who quiz on The Afternoon Show itself, featuring a group Sydney-based fans from the Australasian Doctor Who Fan Club, including future Doctor Who author, Kate Orman, to further celebrate the anniversary date. This is covered in further detail in a 2023 Australian documentary, I Was A Teenage Time Lord.

After all of Sylvester McCoy's serials had been broadcast, the ABC recommenced its screenings of Tom Baker-era Doctor Who episodes until 20 October 1989 when the remainder of season 25 was transmitted, in production order rather than UK broadcast order. As a result, the ABC's transmission began with The Greatest Show in the Galaxy and ended with The Happiness Patrol. These stories were repeated in 1990 prior to the broadcast of the classic era's final season, season 26, on 29 October 1990.

=== 1996: The Telemovie ===
The first attempt to revive Doctor Who was with a made-for-TV movie in 1996. It featured Sylvester McCoy in his final portrayal of the Seventh Doctor and introduced Paul McGann as the Eighth Doctor. The ABC premiere of the movie was on Sunday 7 July at 8.30 pm, nearly two months after its Canadian and US debut and almost six weeks after its first airing in the UK. The ABC had originally planned a 3 July airdate, but did not want to clash with The X-Files, which was already established in the 8:30 pm Wednesday timeslot and was achieving its peak success in Australia at the time.

Material in the movie was cut in the US to allow for extra advertising time, but these cuts were largely restored for the ABC's Australian broadcast. A publicity screening of the cut version had been held on 5 June at Planet Hollywood in Sydney, with several fan-built Daleks operated by fan club members acting as ushers.

=== 2005: The revival of Doctor Who ===
When the BBC revived Doctor Who in 2005 with Christopher Eccleston as the Doctor and with Russell T Davies as producer, the ABC responded by scheduling the series in the prime-time 7:30 pm Saturday slot. Following the UK broadcast by less than two months, Series 1 of the new Doctor Who premiered in Australia with the first episode, Rose, on 21 May 2005, going on to win its timeslot in four out of five capital cities.

Following the ABC's premiere of The Runaway Bride at 8:35 pm on Thursday 28 June 2007, Series 3 was again broadcast in the 7:30 pm Saturday slot from 30 June.

On 26 October 2022 the ABC announced that Jodie Whittaker's final episode, The Power of the Doctor, would be the last first-run episode of Doctor Who to be broadcast on the ABC, with the series moving to Disney+ from 2023 onwards.

Unlike the classic series, which saw innumerable instances of censorship, both societal changes as well as changes to the television ratings classification system itself have meant that networks have been more free to show material that may not have been allowed to air at all in the 1960s or 1970s. Aside from some early references to violence or horror that was toned down or removed altogether in post-production the new series has generally been free from censorship.

== Censorship ==
In 1996, about 25 minutes worth of some very short censored black and white 16mm film clips were recovered from the National Archive vaults, snipped by the censor from a variety of 1960s episodes, these cut portions of 16mm film had not been in the hands of the ABC, and had been impounded by the Australian censors. The classification for the series Doctor Who is PG-13.

== Merchandise ==
Other stray items have been "Show Bags" full of ephemeral bits and pieces, usually of a fairly poor quality for children, and sold at major "shows" (usually related to rural production with fun fairs and other activities) such as the "Royal Easter Show" in Sydney where the stall holder also distributed some leaflets to promote the national club, and he had plans to tour many rural towns throughout the state of New South Wales, and maybe to go further afield. A similar (or even identical) product was sold at the Royal Melbourne Show.

== Fandom ==
=== Pre-history ===
There may have been some isolated Australian branches of Keith Miller's British Doctor Who club, and there was at least one small suburban club-ette in Sydney around 1974 (recalled by Kerrie Dougherty), as well as occasional signs of fan activity here and there (e.g. a fan organised film screening in Sydney of Daleks - Invasion Earth 2150 AD in 1975, and an issue of a Tolkien fanzine devoted to Doctor Who, issued as "Macra" in late 1975). But before 1976 there was no solid fan organisation. The last three of these strands came together at Sydney University in 1975–76, which led to the formation of a national club in August 1976. Members of the Sydney University Science Fiction Association ("SUSFA"), decided to build a Dalek to enter in a planned Dalek race to be held over Easter 1976 year to race other Daleks at a University Science Fiction Convention "Unicon 2" at Melbourne University over Easter (for photos of these Daleks and others, go to "External Links" below for the site "Daleksdownunder"). Although the Melbourne students had built their Dalek in 1975, and Adelaide students also built one, there is no evidence either group went on to form a Doctor Who club. However, after winning this race the SUSFA members were fired up and organised screenings of both Dalek films, and arranged a number of other activities involving the Dalek around campus at Sydney University during 1976.

But why this led to a dedicated Doctor Who club at Sydney University and not elsewhere must remain a mystery. Perhaps their Daleks were just student pranks, and not signs of dedicated fan obsession. The change at Sydney into a Doctor Who fanclub with fanzine (Zerinza) requires an outline of some of the broadcasting context as it related to fans (in more detail above). By the mid-1970s the series was not rating well and the ABC used less and less new material every year, slowly getting well over a year behind the BBC's screenings in Britain, and missing several stories. Fed up with such sporadic sequencing during 1974–77, a Sydney fan, Antony Howe, began to agitate to have the series shown in full, and soon after the premieres in Britain rather than being screened years later. Other demands were to stop the censorship of whole stories (many had been rated "A" by the censor, limited to screening after 7.30 pm which the ABC refused to do), and to have more repeats. Such criticisms were made public in the special "Dalek Soit" science fiction edition of the famous student newspaper Honi Soit which featured news and photographs of the club Dalek's conquest of the campus, and an appreciative quasi-academic article on the Doctor Who TV series, by local science fiction author Terry Dowling. Also flagged was the launch of a Doctor Who fanzine (see Zerinza) and addresses were given for overseas Doctor Who fan clubs, so a local club was not yet envisaged.

=== The 1976 Save Doctor Who campaign ===
During the vacation Antony Howe learned the ABC had actually decided to cease purchasing any new episodes of the series, and the planned "Dalek Demo" now had a more urgent goal – to "Save Doctor Who". Organised by Howe, SUSFA members and others, the "Dalek Demo" of 24 August 1976 helped create a small core of people who formed fandom in Sydney, then the rest of Australia, but only about 20 turned up at the peak, with a dozen people or so were present at other times. Even ABC Programme Dept. staff said they knew nothing about the top level decision. Management's decision was also widely revealed in the student newspaper and fans urged to begin a letter writing campaign, and to join the new Australasian Dr Who Fan Club, and attend a screening of the film Doctor Who and the Daleks where further details were announced. Thus was a longer term campaign to "Save Doctor Who" had been launched: complete with posters and leaflets; networking with existing Science Fiction enthusiasts around the country; a radio interview; and letter writing campaigns to the rest of the media, not just the ABC. The "Demo" and other efforts are widely thought by fans and others to have encouraged the broadcaster to change its mind. Howe, however, has doubts that such a small "Demo", and club, had much effect on a huge bureaucracy like the ABC. Eventually the ABC did buy the new series (season 2 and 3 of Tom Baker), Howe believes this was probably due to the high ratings in Britain, rather than to his own efforts.

The campaign did however, lead to a fan magazine and club. Reporting on the "Demo" and associated activities, Howe formed a club, linked up with the UK club (DWAS), and launched his fanzine "Zerinza: the Australasian Doctor Who Fanzine" in August 1976 at a Sydney University screening of "Dr. Who and the Daleks" he had organised for SUSFA (on 21 Sept. 1976).

=== Other clubs and groups ===
The Supreme Council of Time Lords introduced the first Australian and New Zealand fan award system, the Double Gammas, open to all Australia and New Zealand Doctor Who fanzines, fan writers, fan artists, with fans members of any Australian or New Zealand Doctor Who club or readers of any Australian or New Zealand Doctor Who fanzine or newsletter, able to nominate and vote. These awards were first presented in 1984 at "Who Do 84", during the Time Lord Ball.

Australia also has a number of regional state-based clubs.

The Queensland Doctor Who Fan Club was formed in about 1978. It closed in late 1980, but other successor clubs almost immediately sprang up, usually affiliated to the national club, such as the Brisbane Doctor Who Fan Club (closed 2000).
