= Tat Wood =

British writer

Tat Wood is a British writer, known for his non-fiction work in the field of science fiction analysis.

Wood has written the About Time episode guides to the television series Doctor Who. The first five volumes of the series, begun in 2004, were written with Lawrence Miles and emphasise the importance of understanding the series in the context of British politics, culture and science. Volume Six was, barring a guest-piece by Robert Shearman, entirely Wood's work. Volumes Seven, Eight and Nine were co-written with Dorothy Ail after Miles left the project. Wood and Ail updated the e-book editions of volumes Five and Six. The updated Volume Three, substantially expanded solely by Wood but retaining a few pieces of Miles's work, was published in 2008 and longlisted for the BSFA Award for non-fiction. A revised two-part Volume Four was published in 2023.

In addition to this series, Wood has contributed to non-fiction works for other publishers, including Time and Relative Dissertations in Space (Manchester University Press 2006), The Cult TV Book (IB Tauris 2010), TARDIS Outside In, Volume 2 (ATB Books 2013), and Outside In Boldly Goes (2015). In November 2014 he gave a talk for the "ON TV" symposium held in Sheffield by the University of Northampton. He and Ail wrote World History in Minutes for Quercus Books in 2015.

Wood has written for Doctor Who Magazine, Starburst, TV Zone, Film Review and XPosé on subjects as diverse as crop circles, art fraud, the problems of adapting children's novels for television and the Piltdown hoax. In a 1993 edition of Dreamwatch, he wrote a piece entitled "Hai! Anxiety", in which he criticised the Jon Pertwee era of the series.

He is also active in Doctor Who fandom, notably as editor of the fanzines Spectrox, Yak Butter Sandwich and Spaceball Ricochet. Some of his fan writing was included in the anthology Licence Denied, published in 1997.
