= Anita Sengupta =

American aerospace engineer

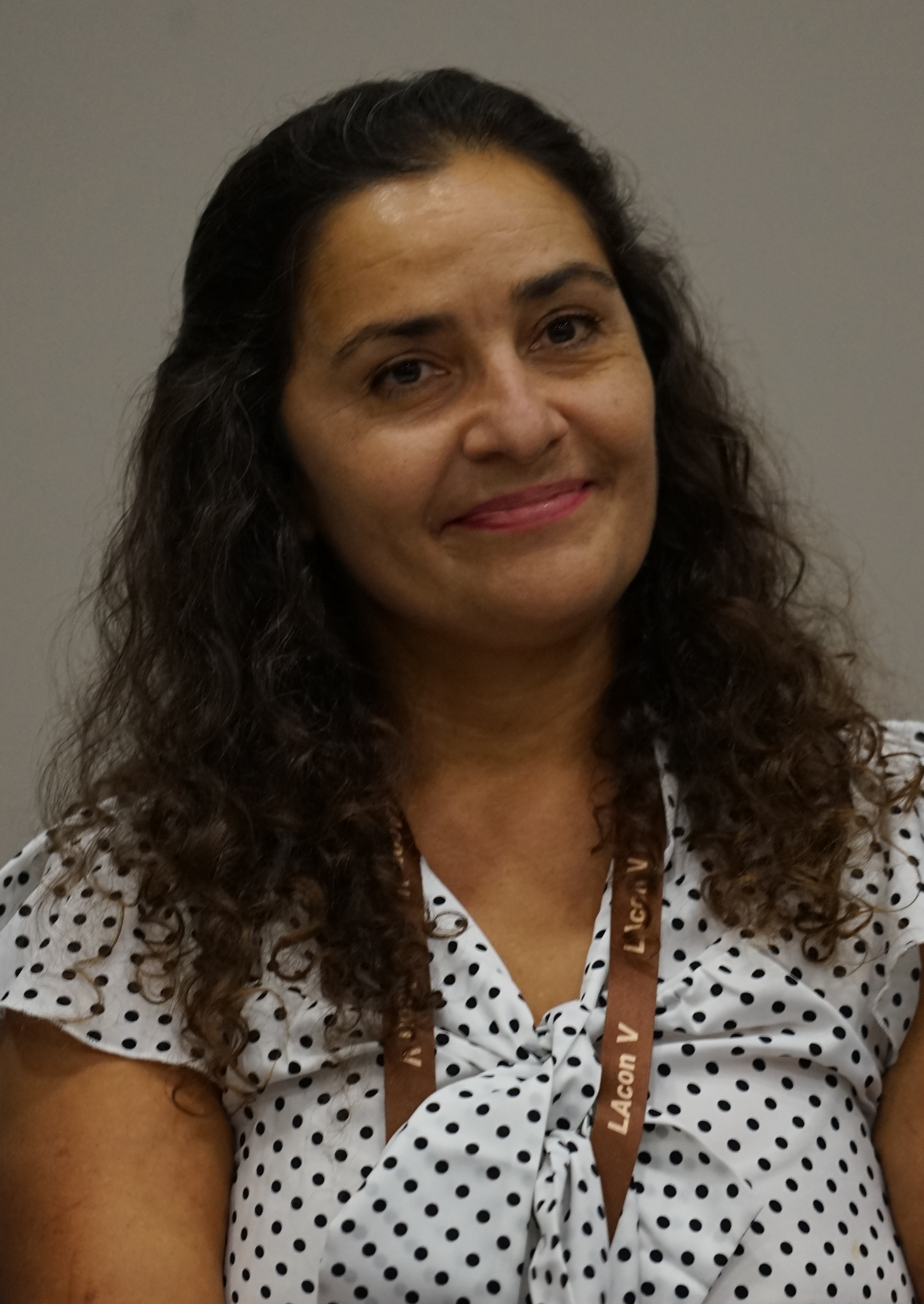
- Sepgupta at Worldcon 2026
- Born: Glasgow, Scotland
- Education: University of Southern California
- Alma mater: Boston University; University of Southern California
- Known for: Cold Atom Laboratory; Mars Science Laboratory; Deep Space 1 Ion propulsion
- Awards: Best technical paper by the Electric Propulsion Technical Committee of the AIAA ASEI Woman Engineer of the Year Recipient; Popular Mechanics Breakthrough Award; ASEI Engineer of the Year; NAA Stinson Trophy; Women in Emerging Aviation Technologies Hall of Fame; SheRoes Trail Blazer USPAACC Reuters 2026 Trail Blazing Women in Energy
- Scientific career
- Fields: Aerospace engineer Electric Propulsion; Entry Descent and Landing; Supersonic Parachutes; Hydrogen Fuel Cells Hydrogen Aviation
- Workplaces: NASA; Jet Propulsion Laboratory; California Institute of Technology; University of Southern California; Virgin Hyperloop One; Hydroplane_Ltd. United Nations CEET
- Thesis: Experimental and Analytical Investigation of a Ring Cusp Ion Thruster Discharge Chamber Physics and Performance (2005)
- Doctoral advisor: Dan Erwin
- Website: anitasengupta.com

Anita Sengupta is an American aerospace engineer. She is a graduate in aerospace engineering (MS '00, Ph.D. '05) of the Viterbi School of Engineering at the University of Southern California. She was the lead systems engineer of the team that developed the parachute system that was deployed during the landing of Mars Science Laboratory Curiosity. She also led the development of testing of the NASA Orion (spacecraft) drogue parachute used for the NASA Artemis program Re-Entry. She was subsequently the project manager of the Cold Atom Laboratory at the Jet Propulsion Laboratory at Caltech. She was then the Senior Vice President of Systems Engineering at Virgin Hyperloop One. She is currently CEO and Founder of Hydroplane Ltd.. She is also a member of the United Nations Council of Engineers for the Energy Transition (CEET). She is also an Adjunct Associate Professor of Astronautical Engineering at USC. She is the recipient of numerous awards and honors including: induction into the Women in Emerging Aviation Technologies Hall of Fame in 2022, she was awarded the National Aeronautics Association (NAA) Stinson Trophy in 2022, and in 2024 she was named a SheRoes Trailblazer by USPAACC In 2026 she was named a Women Trailblazer in Energy by Reuters.

Anita Sengupta is also a science communicator and has delivered multiple TEDx lectures, Royal Institution lectures, keynote addresses, podcasts, and media appearances across the globe. She has appeared in the film Geek Girls, in two episodes of Killers of the Cosmos. She also delivered the 47th University of Oxford Lubbock Lecture in 2022. Most recently she delivered the keynote for the Beach Women in Engineering conference. She is also featured on numerous BBC Radio programs including Discovery Life Changers, World Wise Web, and most recently Puffed Up.

== Early life and training ==
Sengupta was born in Glasgow, Scotland before emigrating to New York where she was raised thereafter. Her father hailed from West Bengal, India, and was a mechanical engineer who studied at the Indian Institute of Technology. Her mother was an expert in French and German. Her parents met at the University of Liverpool. Sengupta is an avid science fiction fan including Doctor Who and Star Trek.. She is also a FAA commercial pilot, PADI scuba diver, sport motorcyclist, mountain biker, and avid hiker.

== Cold Atom Laboratory ==
Anita Sengupta was the CAL Project Manager from the projects inception, for which she and the team was awarded a Popular Mechanics Prize CAL is a facility for the study of ultra-cold quantum gases in the microgravity environment of the International Space Station (ISS). It will enable research in a temperature regime and force free environment that is inaccessible to terrestrial laboratories. In the microgravity environment, up to 20 second long interaction times and as low as 1 picokelvin temperatures are achievable, unlocking the potential to observe new quantum phenomena. The CAL facility is designed for use by multiple scientific investigators and to be upgradable/maintainable on orbit. CAL will also be a pathfinder experiment for future quantum sensors based on laser cooled atoms.

== Hydroplane Ltd. ==
Anita Sengupta founded Hydroplane Ltd. in 2020 on a mission to decarbonize aviation with Hydrogen fuel cell based aviation powerplants. The company has been awarded multiple SBIR/STTR contracts with the US Air Force, US Marine Corps, and US Army. The company was a winner of Army xTech 8 and is a Finalist in the US Army xtech Humanoid. The company also received a CA Energy Commission CalTestBed Voucher grant. The company was named a Titan Innovation Company and Top Company for Women in 2022. The company was named Minority Emerging Technology and Industries Firm of the Year in 2023 . The company was named a Top 50 Global Resiliency Company by the QBE Foundation in 2025. The company has received numerous government Small Business Innovative research contracts including an Air Force Phase 2, Marine Corps Phase 1, and Army Phase 2.

== See also ==
- Adam Steltzner
- Bobak Ferdowsi
- William Shatner
