= Stacey Smith? =

Australian-Canadian mathematician

- Born: Robert Joseph Smith; 28 October 1972 (age 53)
- Education: Macquarie University (BSc (HONS)); McMaster University (MSc, PhD)
- Occupations: Mathematician and writer
- Years active: 2003–present

Stacey R. Smith? (Note: Her personal website says the question mark is part of her name, and at some point she also added a question mark at the end of her former name.) (formerly Robert Joseph Smith?, born 28 October 1972) is an Australian-Canadian mathematician known for scholarly research work on the modeling of infectious outbreaks, particularly including the analysis of outbreaks of zombies and Bieber Fever (a phenomenon characterized by extreme fandom for the Canadian singer Justin Bieber). She has also published scholarly books on science fiction.

== Life and career ==
Smith? received a bachelor's degree in mathematics from Macquarie University in Sydney, Australia, in 1994. After graduation, she went to McMaster University, where she received a master's degree in 1996 and a Ph.D. in 2001. Her doctoral thesis investigated the technique of self-cycling fermentation; her Ph.D. advisor was Gail Wolkowicz.

After finishing her doctorate, Smith? worked as a postdoctoral researcher at the University of Western Ontario, where she became involved with the mathematical study of disease. Smith? did further postdoctoral research at the University of California, Los Angeles, and at the University of Illinois Urbana-Champaign.

In 2009, Smith? published the first academic article mathematically modeling a zombie outbreak, which brought Smith? to the attention of international media, including a Guinness World Record for being the first mathematician to create such a model. Smith? received further attention in media in 2012 for publishing a mathematical model of "Bieber Fever", together with her student, Valerie Tweedle. In 2019, she was awarded the Society for Mathematical Biology's Distinguished Service Award, and then elected a fellow of the Society in 2025.

As of December 2025, Smith? is a professor of mathematics and statistics at the University of Ottawa.

She has also written a Doctor Who short story published in the "Short Trips: History of Christmas" collection, as well as several Doctor Who reference books.

== Personal life ==
Smith? is a trans woman and is polyamorous.
