= Gail Wolkowicz =

Canadian mathematician

Gail Susan Kohl Wolkowicz is a Canadian researcher in differential equations, dynamical systems, and mathematical biology who works as a professor of mathematics and statistics at McMaster University. She is known, among other contributions, for her proof that the competitive exclusion principle holds for inter-species competition in the chemostat.

After earning bachelor's and master's degrees at McGill University, Wolkowicz completed her doctorate in 1984 at the University of Alberta, under the supervision of Geoffrey J. Butler. Her dissertation was entitled "An Analysis of Mathematical Models Related to the Chemostat." After postdoctoral studies at Emory University and Brown University, she joined the McMaster faculty in 1986. One of her PhD students was Stacey Smith?.

Wolkowicz won the Krieger–Nelson Prize in 2014. One of her papers, "Mathematical model of anaerobic digestion in a chemostat: effects of syntrophy and inhibition" (with Marion Weedermann and Gunog Seo) won the biennial Lord Robert May Best Paper Prize of the Journal of Biological Dynamics, in which it was published.
