= Christopher Jones (comics) =

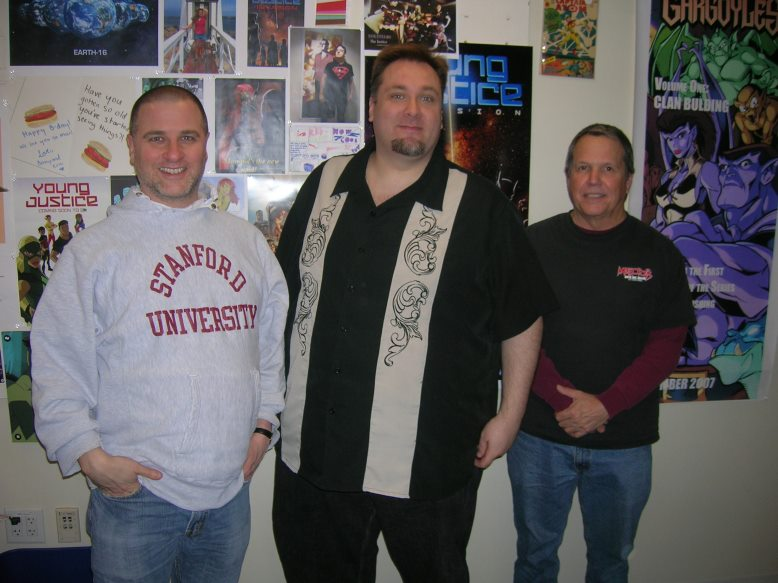
- Greg Weisman, Christopher Jones and Kevin Hopps (left to right) are pictured at the Warner Brothers Animation studios in February of 2012.
- Born: October 14, 1969 (age 57)
- Areas: Penciller, Inker
- Notable works: Young Justice, Avengers: Earth's Mightiest Heroes, The Batman Strikes, Dr. Blink Superhero Shrink, Re-Animator

Christopher A. Jones (born October 14, 1969) is an American comic book artist living in Minneapolis, Minnesota. He contributes artwork for DC Comics' Young Justice (2011-2013), based on the animated TV series of the same name and written by Greg Weisman, and Marvel's Avengers: Earth's Mightiest Heroes (2012–present), based on the animated TV series of the same name and written by Christopher Yost. Christopher Jones has previously contributed art to The Batman Strikes! (2004-2008), is the co-creator of Dr. Blink Superhero Shrink and has drawn various projects for DC, Marvel, Disney, and other publishers, ranging from kids' titles such as Superhero Squad to horror titles such as Re-Animator.
