= Sarah Milkovich =

Scientist

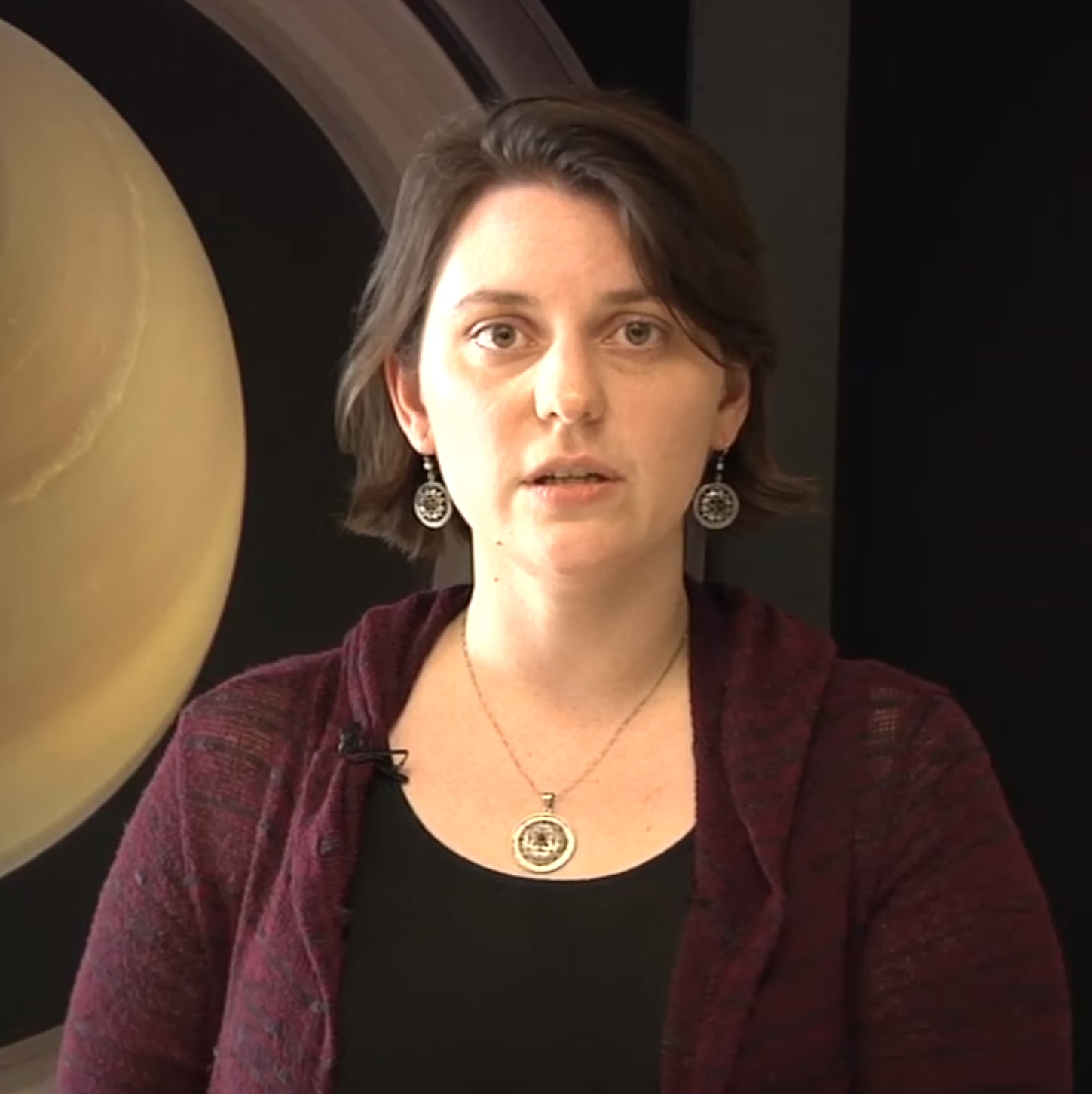
- Milkovich speaks at the NASA Jet Propulsion Laboratory in 2015
- Education: Brown University; California Institute of Technology
- Known for: HiRISE; Mars 2020
- Scientific career
- Workplaces: Jet Propulsion Laboratory

Sarah Milkovich is lead of Science Operations for the Mars 2020 rover at Jet Propulsion Laboratory. She was investigation scientist for the HiRISE camera on the Mars Reconnaissance Orbiter.

== Education ==
Milkovich grew up in Ithaca, New York. Here she became interested in astronomy watching TV specials about spacecraft of Nova and PBS, and during vacations in northern Minnesota. She used to watch the Perseid Meteor Shower with her parents. Milkovich attended Phillips Exeter Academy, which she graduated in 1996. Whilst a high school student, she worked as an intern for the NEAR Shoemaker spacecraft. She earned a bachelor's degree in planetary science at California Institute of Technology in 2000. She moved to Brown University, where she earned a master's degree and PhD in planetary geology in 2005.

== Career ==
Milkovich joined the NASA Jet Propulsion Laboratory after completed her PhD. There she has worked on the Mars Phoenix landing spacecraft, the Cassini–Huygens mission and Mars Reconnaissance Orbiter. Her first rover was Curiosity, for which she was responsible for high-resolution imaging using HiRISE. She was most proud of the Mars Science Laboratory parachute image of Curiosity's landing. HiRISE allowed Milkovich and scientists to take turns to choose where images were taken, and took suggestions from the public. She featured on C-SPAN representing NASA to talk about developments in Curiosity.

Milkovich is the lead Science systems Engineer for Jet Propulsion Laboratory's Mars 2020 rover. The rover is estimated to cost $2 billion.

She regularly appears on online science podcasts and videos. She visits schools and gives public talks to inspire the next generation of scientists and engineers. She has been a keynote speaker at Dragon Con in 2016 and 2018.
