= Doctor Who Appreciation Society =

Fan club

- Abbreviation: DWAS
- Formation: 1976
- Region served: Worldwide (based in United Kingdom)
- President: Colin Baker
- Website: www.dwasonline.co.uk

The Doctor Who Appreciation Society (DWAS) is a society for fans of the television series Doctor Who. It was founded in May 1976, emerging from the Westfield College Doctor Who Appreciation Society, and the editors and readers of the fanzine Tardis.

The society produces a monthly print magazine, Celestial Toyroom (sent to the society's members), a quarterly digital magazine, Cosmic Masque (free to access via the DWAS website), hosts conventions, organises a network of local groups, and provides discounts to members for Doctor Who-related merchandise for sale on the society's online shop. Since 2017 it has also published 'The Celestial Toyroom Annual' which is a compendium of items about a specific lead actor's contribution. The annuals are free to download with a limited run print copy produced for charity. The 2020 annual featured the Jon Pertwee era.

== History ==
=== 1970s – origins ===
The society gained recognition from the Doctor Who production office at the BBC in 1976, succeeding the Doctor Who Fan Club which had operated since the late 1960s. Whereas the earlier fan clubs had often had only a single organiser, the DWAS was headed by an executive committee.

Early activities included the establishment of a newsletter to promote fan communication through pen-pals and swaps, titled The Celestial Toyroom after the first episode of the story The Celestial Toymaker, and the establishment of a reference department to collate and circulate accurate information about the production and storyline of each Doctor Who episode, headed by Jeremy Bentham. Early recognition came when the second edition of The Making of Doctor Who (1976) acknowledged society president Jan Vincent-Rudzki and co-ordinator Stephen Payne "and members of the Doctor Who Appreciation Society" for their help in writing the book. 1977 saw members of the society help with the BBC documentary Whose Doctor Who?, and the society stage the first Doctor Who convention, held at Broomwood Church Hall, Broomwood Road, Battersea, London on 6 August 1977.

During 1976 and 1977 membership of the society had been free of charge. Membership seems to have been loosely defined, and members and non-members paid to receive Tardis, The Celestial Toyroom (which was merged with Tardis for the duration of 1977) and other items such as the reference department's 'StInfos' without any of these charges being interpreted as society membership fees. However, anxieties expressed by the production office and the BBC's legal department about the reproduction of copyright material contributed towards the introduction of a membership fee with effect from January 1978. Restrictions on the exchange of copyrighted material such as off-air audio recordings through the society's publications were also introduced. A restyled Celestial Toyroom would be sent to all society members to carry news about the programme, associated merchandise, and the society, while members would continue to pay for Tardis, which moved from monthly to bi-monthly publication, and reference department items.

This set the pattern for the next few years. Late 1977 saw the emergence of the DWAS's fiction magazine, Cosmic Masque, edited initially by John Peel and Steven Roy Evans (writer). In 1978 the convention was given the name Panopticon, named after both the ceremonial gathering-place on Gallifrey and the prison building designed by Jeremy Bentham, namesake and ancestor of the head of the society's reference department. The advent of Marvel's Doctor Who Weekly in October 1979 led to changes as Bentham became its principal feature writer, and resigned as head of the reference department. He was replaced by David J. Howe.

=== 1980s to present ===
During 1980 the remaining founders of the society resigned from the executive, president Jan Vincent-Rudzki departing in August. Vincent-Rudzki went on to join Stephen Payne in founding the magazine publishing company Visual Imagination.

Challenges faced by the society in the early 1980s included tighter control of news by the production office; Vincent-Rudzki complained in his last president's column that independent fanzines were printing news about the forthcoming season which the production office had asked DWAS not to publicise. This would be an issue throughout the 1980s. Another issue was the growth of the society's local group network, which by October 1980 included seventeen groups, two of which were in North America. The society executive felt that they were unable to effectively supervise overseas groups, for whose actions they had legal responsibility, and withdrew recognition from them as DWAS local groups. The society continued to recognise an allied North American Doctor Who Appreciation Society until 1984, but the change encouraged the formation of the Doctor Who Information Network as a fully distinct society for Doctor Who fans in Canada.

New ideas introduced in the early 1980s included a fanzine poll and regular fanzine reviews in Celestial Toyroom. Smaller events such as Interfaces and DWASocials began, complementing Panopticon. The local group network continued to expand. While the executive never became an elected committee, executive members made visits to local groups and the DWASocials included panels where society members could express their views on society governance. Membership fell for a period in the early 1980s – recorded at 1820 in the August 1981 Celestial Toyroom, it had fallen to 1000 by November 1982 – but then began an upturn, reaching 1175 by March 1983, and 1550 by December. The rise was probably helped by the DWAS's presence at the BBC-run Doctor Who convention held at Longleat, Wiltshire, in March 1983. Membership peaked at just over 3000 in the mid 1980s.

During the early 1980s Celestial Toyroom remained a brief monthly newsletter, with Tardis (which moved to quarterly publication in 1983) being the main forum of articles and letters.

Developments in the late 1980s included a decline in membership, perhaps due to the evolution of Marvel's Doctor Who Magazine into a more fan-based publication. Rival services also appeared, such as DWB for monthly news, The Whonatics or the MLG for local gatherings, and Phoenix for conventions.

Failure to register for VAT led to a crisis in the Society's finances in the late 1980s, but the DWAS recovered from this to survive as the core grouping of Doctor Who fandom in the UK. A separate company, Space Rocket Ltd, now administers commercial affairs such as conventions and sales, on behalf of the DWAS. This does not extend to running 'Panopticon' which was for some years regarded by many as the premier UK Doctor Who event. The rights rest with a company called 'Dominitemporal Services Ltd' into which many DWAS commercial services were initially hived, following the VAT problems. DWAS holds only a minority stake in the company and has yet to succeed in bringing the 'Panopticon' brand back to the Doctor Who events market – the Society had absolutely no involvement in Panopticon in 2003 – the first totally DWAS-free Panopticon. The subsequent revival of the brand that took place in 2019 was unconnected with the Society who were not even aware of the planned date and venue until it was announced.

Despite this, DWAS remains a presence amongst UK events organisers and has had a long association with Riverside Studios in Hammersmith, presenting many events there since 2004. These have included some organised with the cooperation of BBC Worldwide (and before that 2Entertain), most notably a full advance screening of the Day of the Daleks DVD Special Edition in 2011.

The Society has had a number of Honorary Presidents. The first was Jon Pertwee, who held the post until his death in 1996. From 1997 until his death in 2011, the Society's honorary president was Nicholas Courtney, who played the hugely popular recurring character Brigadier Lethbridge-Stewart on the series from 1968 to 1989. Upon Courtney's death, Colin Baker, who played the sixth incarnation of the Doctor, was elected as his replacement.

=== 40th Anniversary (2016) ===
In May 2016, the DWAS celebrated its 40th anniversary, having been in existence since 1976. Celebrations included a two-day convention, The Capitol, held at the Arora Hotel, Gatwick on Saturday 6th and Sunday 7 May 2016, the digital revival of the fan fiction-based magazine Cosmic Masque, and a members' poll on numerous aspects of the show with awards presented at The Capitol. The Society also produced a small number of commemorative items such as 40th anniversary badges and mugs.

'The Capitol' has subsequently become the Society's primary convention brand with further events held in 2017 and 2018, and 2019. The event planned for 2020 was delayed by the COVID pandemic and eventually took place in 2022, with another planned for 2023.

== Blue Plaques ==
In 2014, DWAS raised funds for a blue heritage plaque erected at Riverside Studios in Hammersmith in memory of the show's first producer Verity Lambert. This was unveiled by her friend and well known director Waris Hussein at a special free-to-enter event which included a big screen presentation of the BBC docu-drama An Adventure in Space and Time. Following the closure for redevelopment of Riverside later that year, the plaque was placed into storage. It was re-dedicated in 2022, now installed on the exterior of the new building.

Following this, in 2016, the Society raised funds for another plaque in memory of Jon Pertwee at New Wimbledon Theatre in London. This was unveiled at another free-to-enter event on 23 October 2016 by the Society's current president Colin Baker.

In August 2018, the Society announced that agreement had been reached with Ealing Studios for a plaque honouring William Hartnell. The plaque was unveiled on 14 October 2018 by Hartnell's granddaughter, Jessica Carney. Following the decision to renovate Ealing Studios, the plaque was placed into storage in 2023 pending re-installation.

July 2023 saw a plaque honouring Patrick Troughton installed at The Patrick Troughton Theatre at Mill Hill School in London where he studied as a teenager. The plaque was unveiled by two of his children, Jo and Michael in the presence of friends and family.

== Magazines ==
The Society currently produces a number of regular magazines.

=== Celestial Toyroom ===
Celestial Toyroom was the monthly print magazine, twelve issues of which were sent to members of the DWAS each year. In September 2023 the Society changed the schedule to make Celestial Toyroom a quarterly magazine. Articles are often contributed by members of the Society as well as by more well-known writers. The magazine contains a mix of critical essays on Doctor Who, interviews with cast and crew and other features, including a short comic strip, Whom?, and various features that could be said to think outside the box.The Society announced in 2024 that the magazine, already rescued to quarterly publication, would become an online only product in 2025.

=== Cosmic Masque ===
Alongside Celestial Toyroom was Cosmic Masque, a quarterly digital magazine, revived in Christmas 2015 for the 40th anniversary of the Society in 2016. This is free to access by anyone of the DWAS website, and concentrates more on fan fiction, as well as featuring reviews and fans' letters. Available issues of the magazine can be downloaded from www.dwasonline.co.uk

The Society took the decision to end publication of Cosmic Masque after issue 18 but did not inform the editorial team of this, resulting in an additional issue (number 19) being produced.

=== The Celestial Toyroom Annual ===
First published in 2016 the CT Annual is released over the Christmas and New year holiday period. It is a free-to-download digital magazine, with a limited run hardback up to the 2023 edition also being made available, raising funds for charity. The 2024 annual did not get a hardback version. Each annual concentrates on a different era for each Doctor and those released so far are:

- The 2017 Annual covered the era of the 7th Doctor.
- The 2018 Annual covered the era of the 12th Doctor.
- The 2019 Annual covered the era of the 1st Doctor.
- The 2020 Annual covered the era of the 3rd Doctor.
- The 2021 Annual covered the era of the 2nd Doctor.
- The 2022 Annual covered the era of the 11th Doctor
- The 2023 Annual covered the era of the 6th Doctor.
- The 2024 Annual covered the era of the 4th Doctor.

The 2017 edition was edited by John Davies and the 2018 - 2024 editions by Paul Winter.

All of the annuals can be downloaded from www.dwasonline.co.uk are of free of charge

=== TARDIS ===
TARDIS was the Society's original fan magazine although in fact, it predated the formation of DWAS first being published in early 1976. For many years TARDIS was published as an optional addition to the main Society offering until it was merged into Celestial Toyroom in 1987. An attempt to revive the title in 1997 met with limited success and only ran for six issues. A special edition was produced in 2003 to celebrate the programme's 40th anniversary. In 2020 the Society relaunched TARDIS as a distinct magazine, featuring wholly commissioned content. The editor was Robbie Dunlop. After issue 5 the magazine went back on hiatus

== Events (2015 onwards) ==
The Doctor Who Appreciation Society regularly organises Doctor Who events that take place at venues around the UK.

Title	Date	Location
Back to the Eighties	24/10/15	Pendulum Hotel, Manchester
The Capitol	07/05/16-08/05/16	Arora Hotel Gatwick, Crawley
Polarity Day	23/10/16	New Wimbledon Theatre
The Capitol II	06/05/17-07/05/17	Arora Hotel Gatwick, Crawley
The Capitol III	28/04/2018 – 29/04/2018	Arora Hotel Gatwick, Crawley
Series 11 Launch Party	07/10/2018	Saks Bar, Southend
The Capitol IV	27/04/2019 – 28/04/2019	Arora Hotel Gatwick, Crawley
The Capitol V	02/04/22- 03/04/22	Crowne Plaza Hotel, Gatwick, Crawley

Further events took place in 2023 and 2024 with a one day event planned for 2025

== Audio productions ==
In 1995, the Doctor Who Appreciation Society produced and sold a collection of Doctor Who audio adventures entitled Cosmic Fugue, a spin-off from DWAS's fiction magazine, Cosmic Masque, edited and produced by Jonathan Way and Steven Wickham. All barring two of the stories were specially written for the collection. The collection was presented by Sophie Aldred and the individual stories were read by former Doctor Who stars.

=== Cosmic Fugue ===
Title	Writer	Reader	Doctor	Companion
All Teeth and Claws	Paul Farnsworth	John Leeson		K-9 Mark 1B
K-9 wonders if robotic dogs can go mad.
Cats and Bags	Mark Jones	Peter Miles		Liz Shaw
Liz Shaw attends a university lecture about time travel.
A Game of Sudden Death	Jim Mortimore	Sophie Aldred		Ace
A tale of Ace and the Space Corps.
A New Beginning	Steven Wickham	John Levene		Sgt. Benton
Cpl. Benton meets Colonel Lethbridge-Stewart while being assigned to the newly formed UNIT.
First Dispatches	Mark Jones	Elisabeth Sladen		Dodo Chaplet, Sarah Jane Smith
A young Sarah Jane Smith witnesses Dodo's departure in the TARDIS. Previously published in Cosmic Masque, this was one of two previously published stories in the collection, replacing a planned submission by Gary Russell.
Undercurrents	David Scott	Brian Miller	Unknown Doctor	
A series of coincidence bring about the activation of an Auton.
Childhood Shows the Man	Steven Wickham	Peter Miles		Nyder
The origin of Nyder's cruelty.
Graffiti	Paul D. Smith	Sophie Aldred		Ace
Ace gets up to a bit of mischief.
RSM Benton's Memoirs	Stephen Parsons	John Levene		Sgt. Benton, Brigadier
Sgt. Benton remembers an anti-terrorist operation from his post-UNIT days.
The Skies of Always	Nick Setchfield	Elisabeth Sladen	Fourth Doctor	Sarah Jane Smith
Sarah Jane Smith and the Fourth Doctor visit the Skies of Always and discuss the lives of humans and Timelords. This was one of two stories in the collection previously published in Cosmic Masque.

=== Cosmic Fugue 2 ===
In 1998, the Doctor Who Appreciation Society produced and sold a second collection of Doctor Who audio adventures entitled Cosmic Fugue 2 with profits being donated to the charities HOPE for Romanian Orphans and The Meningitis Trust. The collection was presented by Louise Jameson and the individual stories were read by former Doctor Who stars with additional voices being provided by Nicola Quinn and Steven Wickham.

Title	Writer	Reader	Doctor	Companion
The Lake of Possibilities	Nick Walters	Colin Baker	Sixth Doctor	
The Doctor learns the origins of the Valeyard.
The Blinovitch Link	Barry Letts	Elisabeth Sladen		Sarah Jane Smith
Sarah receives a telephone call from the future.
Help At A Stroke	Steven Wickham	Colin Baker	Sixth Doctor	Georges-Pierre
The Doctor drinks wine with Georges-Pierre, a dour French artist, (implied to be Georges-Pierre Seurat), in a café in Paris.
The Rain Machine	Nick Walters	Caroline John		Liz Shaw
Liz Shaw investigates a scientist's rain machine, aided by the Brigadier.
Slings and Arrows		Colin Baker	Sixth Doctor	
Hamlet, as written by William Shakespeare with help from the Doctor.
Zoe Does It	Crispin Brigham	Wendy Padbury		Zoe Herriot
Zoe searches for part of a crashed spaceship after the TARDIS receives a distress call.
Tomorrow's Times		Colin Baker		
A report on the first Doctor Who Ball, attended by the likes of Meg Loss and Sir Vival.
Savage	Gary Russell	Louise Jameson		Leela
Leela struggles with life on Gallifrey after having left the Doctor.
