= Ed Stradling =

British television producer

Ed Stradling (born 1972), is a television producer and director, who is best known for producing documentaries accompanying the BBC DVD range in the 2000s.

== Documentaries ==
Stradling produced over 40 documentaries and shorts on DVD releases of various TV shows, most notably Doctor Who, also Robin of Sherwood, and with Sir David Attenborough on Civilisation: A Personal View and The Ascent of Man.

In the 2010s he worked on Children's BBC programming, directed Danny Baker's Christmas Hits, as well as music documentaries for the Sky Arts Channel. He has since worked on political and royal programming for Channel 5 and ITV, including General Election specials for ITV's Tonight programme in 2017, 2019 and 2024.

He is also a television archivist and runs The TV Museum YouTube channel.
