= Davros =

Fictional character from Doctor Who

- Doctor Who character
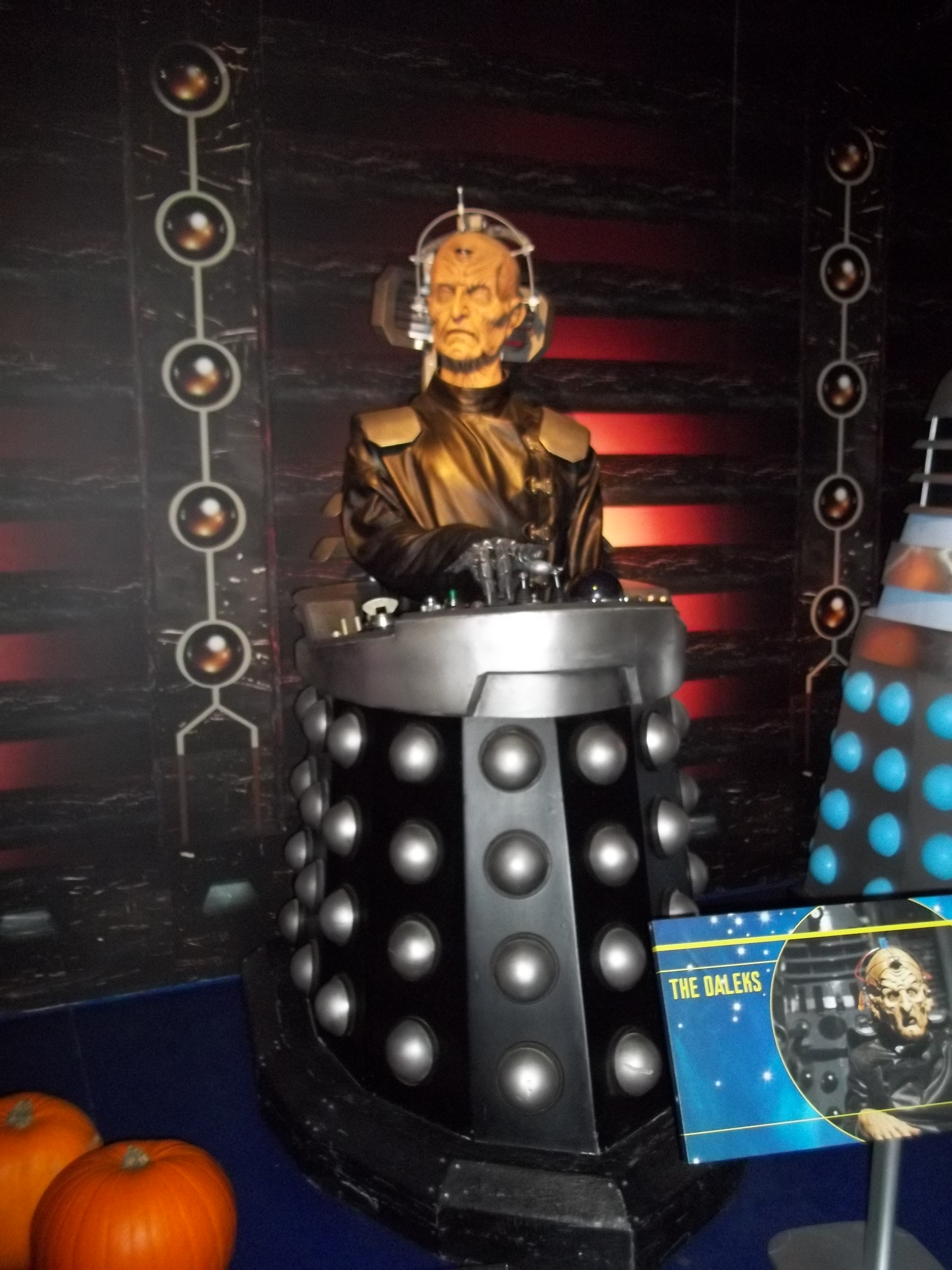
- A model of Davros on display at the Doctor Who Experience
- First appearance: "Genesis of the Daleks" (1975)
- Last appearance: "Destination: Skaro" (2023)
- Created by: Terry Nation
- Portrayed by: Television: Michael Wisher (1975); David Gooderson (1979); Terry Molloy (1984–1985, 1988); Julian Bleach (2008, 2015, 2023); Joey Price (child, 2015); Audio: Terry Molloy (since 2003); Rory Jennings (child, 2006)

In-universe information
- Species: Kaled
- Affiliation: Daleks
- Home: Skaro

Davros (/ˈdævrɒs/) is a fictional character from the long-running British science fiction television series Doctor Who. He was created by screenwriter Terry Nation, originally for the 1975 serial Genesis of the Daleks. Davros is a major enemy, if not the archenemy, of the series' protagonist, the Doctor, and is the creator of the Doctor's deadliest enemies, the Daleks. Davros is a genius who has mastered many areas of science, but also a megalomaniac who believes that through his creations he can become the supreme being and ruler of the Universe. The character has been compared to the infamous dictator Adolf Hitler several times, including by the actor Terry Molloy, while Julian Bleach defined him as a cross between Hitler and the renowned scientist Stephen Hawking.

Davros is from the planet Skaro, whose people, the Kaleds, were engaged in a bitter thousand-year war of attrition with their enemies, the Thals. He is horribly scarred and disabled, a condition that various spin-off media attribute to his laboratory being attacked by a Thal shell. He has one functioning hand and one cybernetic eye mounted on his forehead to take the place of his real eyes, which he is not able to open for long; for much of his existence he depends completely upon a self-designed mobile life-support chair in place of his lower body. It would become an obvious inspiration for his eventual design of the Dalek. The lower half of his body is absent and he is physically incapable of leaving the chair for more than a few minutes without dying. Davros' voice, like those of the Daleks, is electronically distorted. His manner of speech is generally soft and contemplative, but when angered or excited he is prone to ranting outbursts that resemble the hysterical, staccatissimo speech of the Daleks.

== Concept ==
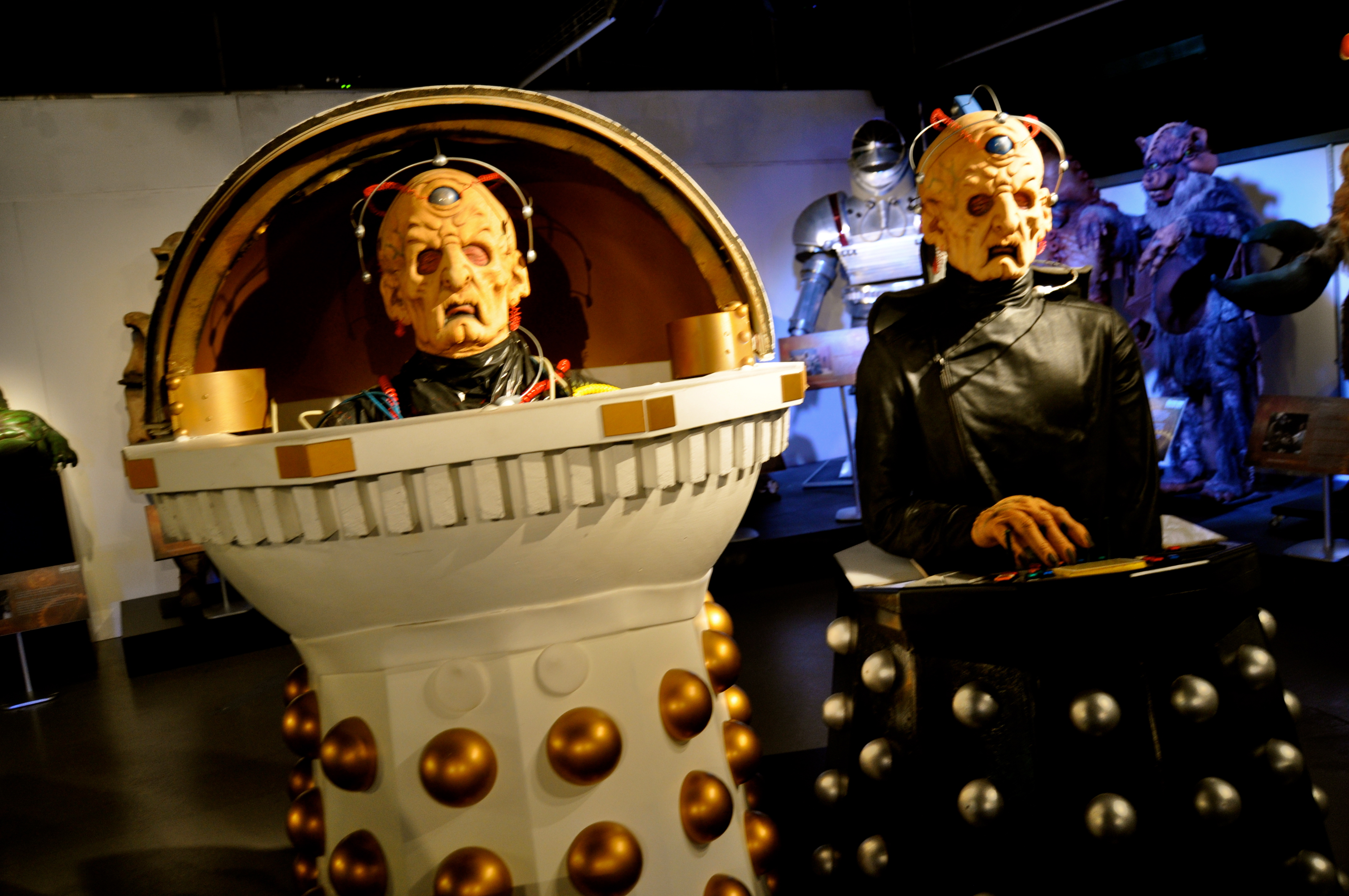
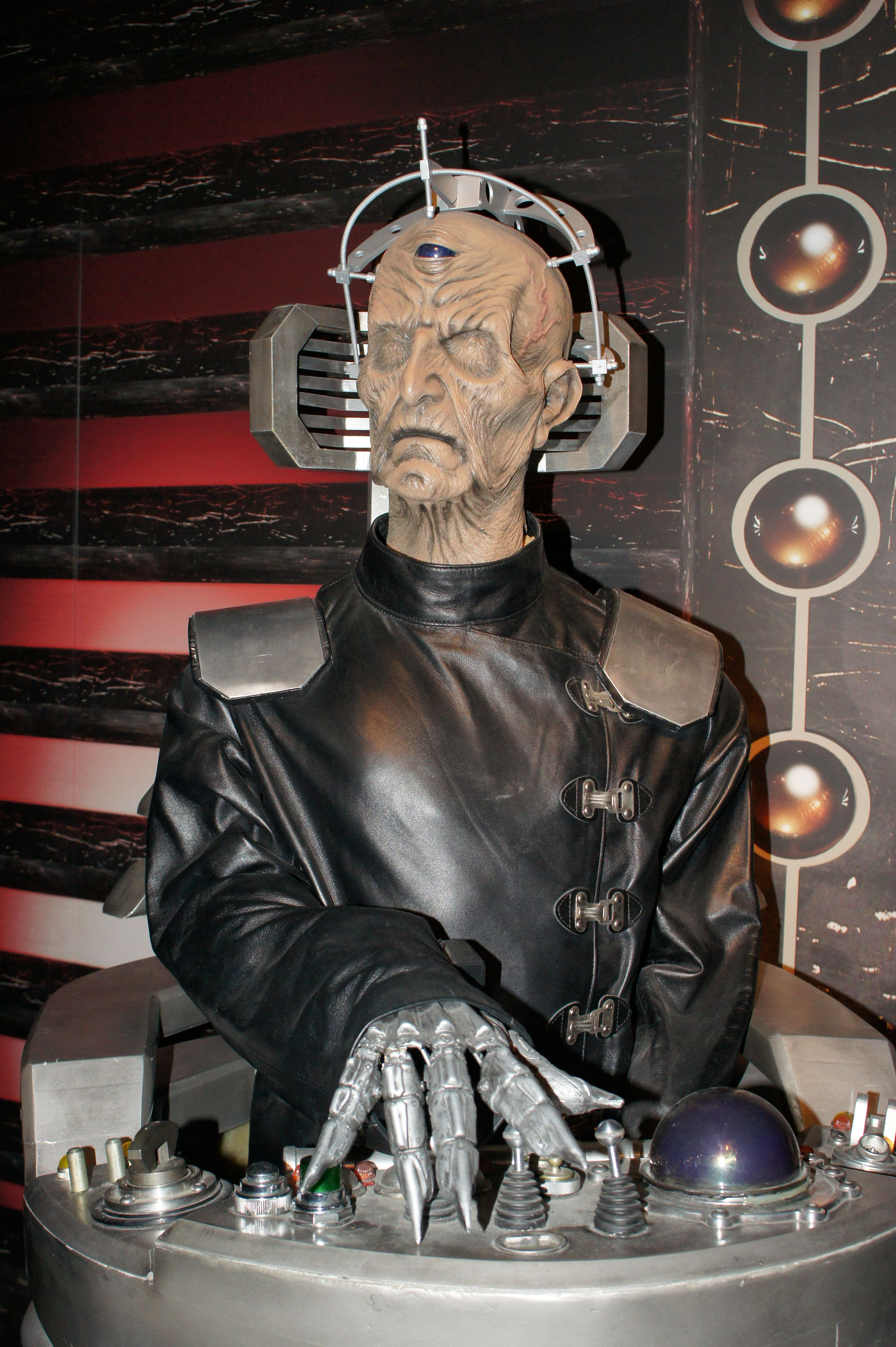
Davros, in the classic series and the revived series, as shown at the Doctor Who Experience

Davros first appeared in the 1975 serial Genesis of the Daleks, written by Terry Nation. Nation, creator of the Dalek concept, had deliberately modelled elements of the Daleks' character on Nazi ideology, and conceived of their creator as a scientist with strong fascist tendencies. The physical appearance of Davros was developed by visual effects designer Peter Day and sculptor John Friedlander, who based Davros' chair on the lower half of a Dalek. Producer Philip Hinchcliffe told Friedlander to consider a design similar to the Mekon from the Eagle comic Dan Dare, with a large dome-like head and a withered body.

Cast in the role of Davros was Michael Wisher, who had previously appeared in several different roles on Doctor Who and had provided Dalek voices in the serials Frontier in Space, Planet of the Daleks and Death to the Daleks. Wisher based his performance as Davros on the philosopher Bertrand Russell. In order to prepare for filming under the heavy mask, Wisher rehearsed wearing a paper bag over his head. Friedlander's mask was cast in hard latex, with only the mouth revealing Wisher's features; make-up artist Sylvia James shaded the mask's tones and blackened Wisher's lips and teeth to hide the transition.

In the serial Destiny of the Daleks, Davros is played by David Gooderson using the mask Friedlander made for Wisher after it was split into intersecting sections to get as good a fit as possible. When Terry Molloy took over the role in Resurrection of the Daleks, a new mask was designed by Stan Mitchell.

In 2023, Julian Bleach, who played the character in four episodes of the revived series, reprised the role of Davros for a minisode aired during Children in Need, informally titled "Destination: Skaro", in which Davros is depicted as non-disabled and without scarring. In an interview for Doctor Who: Unleashed, executive producer Russell T. Davies said that this is how Davros will be depicted in future appearances, to avoid contributing to harmful tropes of disabled villains in media.

"We had long conversations about bringing Davros back, because he's a fantastic character, [but] time and society and culture and taste has moved on. And there's a problem with the Davros of old in that he's a wheelchair user, who is evil. And I had problems with that. And a lot of us on the production team had problems with that, of associating disability with evil. And trust me, there's a very long tradition of this.

"I'm not blaming people in the past at all, but the world changes and when the world changes, Doctor Who has to change as well.

"So we made the choice to bring back Davros without the facial scarring and without the wheelchair – or his support unit, which functions as a wheelchair.

"I say, this is how we see Davros now, this is what he looks like. This is 2023. This is our lens. This is our eye. Things used to be black and white, they're not in black and white anymore, and Davros used to look like that and he looks like this now, and that we are absolutely standing by."

— Russell T. Davies

The decision to portray Davros as an able-bodied character received a divisive reception from fans.

== Character history ==
=== Encounters with the Fourth Doctor ===
Michael Wisher as Davros in Genesis of the Daleks (1975)

The Fourth Doctor (Tom Baker) first encountered Davros (Michael Wisher) in Genesis of the Daleks when he and his companions were sent to Skaro to avert the creation of the Daleks. As chief scientist of the Kaleds and leader of their elite scientific division, Davros devised new military strategies in order to win his people's thousand-year war against the Thal race that also lives on Skaro. When Davros learned his people were evolving from exposure to nuclear weapons, chemical weapons and biological weapons used in the war, he artificially accelerates the process to his design and stores the resulting tentacled creatures in tank-like "Mark III travel machines" partly based on the design of his wheelchair. He later names these creatures "Daleks", an anagram of Kaleds.

Davros quickly becomes obsessed with his creations, considering them to be the ultimate form of life compared to others. When other Kaleds attempted to thwart his project, Davros arranges the extinction of his own people by using the Thals, whom he mostly killed with the Daleks later. Davros then weeds out those in elite scientific division who are loyal to him so he can have the Daleks eliminate the rest. However, the Daleks ultimately turn on Davros, killing his supporters before shooting him when he tries to halt the Dalek production line.

In Destiny of the Daleks, it is revealed that Davros (now played by David Gooderson) was not killed, but placed in suspended animation and buried underground in the destruction of his bunker. The Daleks unearth their creator to help them break a logical impasse in their war against the android Movellans. However, the Dalek force is destroyed by the Doctor, and Davros is captured and imprisoned in suspended animation by the humans, before being taken to Earth to face trial.

=== The Dalek Civil War ===
Davros as played by Terry Molloy, in Revelation of the Daleks (1985)

In the Fifth Doctor story Resurrection of the Daleks, Davros (Terry Molloy) is released from his space station prison by a small Dalek force aided by human mercenaries and Dalek duplicates. The Daleks require Davros to find an antidote for a Movellan-created virus that has all but wiped them out. Believing his creations to be treacherous, Davros begins using a syringe-like mind control device hidden in a secret compartment in his wheelchair on Daleks and humans; he ultimately releases a sample of the virus to kill off the Daleks before they can exterminate him. Davros expresses a desire to build a new and improved race of Daleks, but he apparently succumbs to the virus himself, his physiology being close enough to that of the Daleks for the virus to affect him.

In the Sixth Doctor story Revelation of the Daleks, it is revealed that Davros managed to escape at the end of Resurrection and has gone into hiding as "The Great Healer" of the funeral and cryogenic preservation centre Tranquil Repose on the planet Necros. There, creating a clone of his head to serve as a decoy while modifying his body so that it can fire electric bolts and his chair is able to hover, Davros uses the more intelligent frozen bodies to engineer a new variety of white armoured Daleks loyal to him (while using the lesser intellects as food for the galaxy, ending a galaxy-wide famine), but he is captured by the original Daleks and taken to Skaro to face trial.

Davros' final classic appearance is as the Emperor Dalek in Remembrance of the Daleks, with his white and gold Daleks now based on Skaro and termed "Imperial Daleks", fighting against the grey "Renegade Dalek" faction, who answer to the Dalek Supreme. By this time, Davros has been physically transplanted into a customised Dalek casing. He is only revealed to be the Emperor in the final episode. Both Skaro and the Imperial Dalek mothership are apparently destroyed (in the future) when the Seventh Doctor tricks Davros into using the Time Lord artefact known as the Hand of Omega, which makes Skaro's Sun go supernova, before homing in on their mothership. Davros flees into an escape pod as the ship explodes.

=== The Time War and the Reality Bomb ===
During the revived series, Davros was referred to in the episode "Dalek" (2005) by the Ninth Doctor (Christopher Eccleston), who explains to Henry Van Statten that the Daleks were created by "a genius... a man who was king of his own little world", and again by the Tenth Doctor (David Tennant) in the episode "Evolution of the Daleks" (2007), where he refers to the Daleks' creator as believing that "removing emotions makes you stronger". Davros makes his first physical appearance in the episode "The Stolen Earth" (2008), portrayed by Julian Bleach. The episode reveals that Davros was thought to have died during the first year of the Time War, when his command ship "flew into the jaws of the Nightmare Child" at the Gates of Elysium, despite the Doctor's failed efforts to save him. But Davros was pulled out of the time lock of the war by Dalek Caan (voiced by Nicholas Briggs), using his own flesh to create a "new empire" of Daleks who place him in the Vault as their prisoner to make use of his knowledge. Under Davros' guidance, the Daleks steal 27 planets, including Earth, and hide them in the Medusa Cascade, one second out of sync with the rest of the universe.

In the follow-up episode "Journey's End" (2008), it is revealed that the stolen planets are required as a power source for Davros' ideal final solution: the Reality Bomb, which produces a wavelength that would cancel out the electrical field binding atoms to reduce all life outside the Crucible into nothingness in both his universe and countless other realities. But Davros learns too late that Dalek Caan, who came to the realisation of his race's atrocities as a consequence of saving his creator, used his prophecies and influence to ensure the Daleks' destruction while manipulating events to bring the Tenth Doctor and Donna Noble (Catherine Tate) together for the role the latter would play. Though the Doctor attempts to save him, having earlier taunted the Doctor for turning his companions into killers and being the cause of the deaths of countless people during his travels, Davros furiously refuses the Doctor's help and accuses him of being responsible for the destruction while screaming: "Never forget, Doctor, you did this! I name you forever: You are the Destroyer of Worlds!" Thus the Doctor is forced to leave Davros to his supposed fate as the Crucible self-destructs.

=== Remembering the Twelfth Doctor ===
Davros returns in the two-part Series 9 opening "The Magician's Apprentice" and "The Witch's Familiar" (2015), having escaped the Crucible's destruction and ending up on a restored Skaro with his life being prolonged by the Daleks. But when the aged Davros' health begins to fail, he remembers his childhood self, played by Joey Price, meeting the Twelfth Doctor (Peter Capaldi) during the Kaleds' thousand-year war prior to Genesis of the Daleks. The young Davros finds himself lost on the battlefield and surrounded by handmines, with the Doctor throwing his sonic screwdriver to the boy with the intent to save him before learning his name and leaving the child to his fate. Davros, seeking a final meeting and revenge on the Doctor, employs the snake-like Colony Sarff (Jami Reid-Quarrell) to bring him to Skaro. The Doctor also identifies Davros as his archenemy, much to the jealously of Missy (Michelle Gomez), who promises to scratch his eye out in response.

When it appears that the Doctor has lost his companion Clara Oswald (Jenna Coleman) to the Daleks, Davros manages to trick the Doctor into using his regeneration energy to heal him, extending his own life while infusing every Dalek on Skaro with the energy. But the Doctor reveals Davros' scheme has also revitalised the decomposing-yet-still-alive Daleks left to rot in Skaro's sewers, causing them to revolt and destroy the city. The Doctor then discovers the Daleks have a concept of mercy and are allowed to have the word in their vocabulary when he encounters Clara, having been placed in a Dalek casing by Missy. The Doctor is rescued from Davros' infirmary by Missy, who also takes the time to formally introduce herself to Davros for the first time and, indeed, scratch at his electronic eye. The Doctor and Clara escape, the former having an epiphany as to how Davros somehow put a sliver of compassion into the Daleks. He then returns to the battlefield in Davros' childhood, using a Dalek gun to destroy the handmines with the one bit of compassion in Davros' life instilled in the Daleks' design to ensure Clara being saved.

=== The Fourteenth Doctor ===
In the Children in Need sketch "Destination: Skaro" (2023) (which takes place during an earlier time in the Kaled-Thal war), Davros (Julian Bleach) (who has not yet become disfigured or received the cybernetic eye) is seen presenting a Dalek prototype featuring a robotic claw to his assistant, Castavillian. When he briefly departs to attend to an urgent matter, the Fourteenth Doctor lands in the TARDIS, accidentally destroying the robotic claw. He inadvertently suggests the name "Dalek" for the prototype, mentions its catchphrase of "exterminate" and gives Castavillian a plunger-tipped arm as a replacement for the broken claw. Once he realises that he has accidentally assisted with the creation of his greatest enemy, he quickly departs saying that he was "never here". Davros returns and, after thinking about it while being startled, approves of the new plunger arm.

== Other appearances ==
=== Comic strips ===
Doctor Who Magazine printed several comics stories involving Davros. The first, "Nemesis of the Daleks" (#152–155), with the Seventh Doctor, features an appearance of a Dalek Emperor. Speaking with the Emperor, the Doctor addresses him as Davros, but the Emperor responds "Who is Davros?" The Doctor initially assumes Davros' personality has been totally subsumed, but in the later strip "Emperor of the Daleks" (#197–202) this Emperor is shown as a different entity from Davros. Set prior to Remembrance of the Daleks in Davros' timeline, but after in the timeline of the Doctor, the latter, accompanied by Bernice Summerfield, together with help from the Sixth Doctor, ensures that Davros will survive the wrath of the Daleks so that he can assume the title of Emperor, allowing history to take its course. "Up Above the Gods" (#227), a vignette following up on this, features the Sixth Doctor and Davros having a conversation in the TARDIS.

=== Audio plays ===
Terry Molloy has reprised his role as Davros in the spin-off audio plays produced by Big Finish Productions, mostly notably Davros (taking place during the Sixth Doctor's era), which, through flashbacks, explored the scientist's life prior to his crippling injury, which is attributed to a Thal nuclear attack (an idea that first appeared in Terrance Dicks' novelisation of Genesis of the Daleks).

Davros, which does not feature the Daleks, apparently fills in the gaps between Resurrection of the Daleks and Revelation of the Daleks, and has the scientist trying to manipulate the galaxy's economy into a war footing similar to Skaro's. The Sixth Doctor manages to defeat his plans, and Davros is last heard when his ship explodes, an event obliquely mentioned in Revelation. However the Doctor thinks he has survived. Davros also mentions he will work on a plan to combat famine, tying into Revelation of the Daleks.

The Davros Mission is an original audio adventure (without the Doctor) available on The Complete Davros Collection DVD box set. It takes place directly after the television story Revelation, while leaving the planet Necros and beginning Davros' trial. At the end of Davros Mission, he turns the tables on the Daleks, forcing them to do his bidding. The Big Finish miniseries I, Davros, also features trial scenes, but mostly explores his early life. In those four stories, his journey is seen from his boyhood, to just before Genesis of the Daleks.

The Curse of Davros begins with Davros and the Daleks working together to try and alter the outcome of the Battle of Waterloo using technology that Davros has created that allows him to swap peoples' minds, allowing him to switch various soldiers in Napoleon's army with his own Daleks, ultimately intending to replace Napoleon with a Dalek after Waterloo is won so that he can change history and lead humanity in a direction where they may ally with the Daleks. The plan is complicated when the Sixth Doctor arrives and uses the device to swap bodies with Davros in an attempt to subvert the Daleks' plans from the inside, but Davros-in-the-Doctor is eventually able to convince the Daleks of his true identity, planning to remain in the Doctor's healthy body while leaving the Doctor trapped in his original form. At the end, Davros and the Doctor are returned to their original bodies with the aid of the Doctor's new companion Flip Jackson, the Doctor exposes Davros's true agenda to Napoleon, and Davros is left with an army of Daleks who have had their minds wiped. These Daleks presumably become the "Imperial Daleks", first seen in Remembrance of the Daleks.

In The Juggernauts, Davros is on the run from the original Daleks. He hatches a plan to add human tissue to robotic Mechanoids, using them, along with his own Daleks, to destroy the originals, but the Doctor learns the truth about this plan, and his companion Mel Bush—who unwittingly assisted in the programming of the new Mechanoids—uses a backdoor she installed in their programming to turn them against Davros. At the end of the story, the self-destruct mechanism of Davros' life-support chair explodes after he is attacked by the Mechanoids, destroying an entire human colony. It is not clear how Davros survives to become the Dalek Emperor as seen in Remembrance. However, in the DVD documentary Davros Connections, director Gary Russell points out that the explosion of Davros' life-support chair leaves the listener to believe there is little of Davros left. This fits chronologically the fact that Remembrance depicts Davros as just a head inside the Emperor Dalek.

In Daleks Among Us, set after Remembrance, Davros returns to Azimuth, a planet that was invaded by the Daleks long ago, presenting himself as a victim of Dalek enslavement to infiltrate an underground movement against the repressive government- so desperate to prevent riots about individual actions during the Dalek occupation that official policy is now that the Dalek invasion never happened- seeking the remnants of an old experiment he carried out on the planet. This experiment is revealed to be Falkus, a clone of Davros's original body that was intended to be a new host for his mind, with Falkus having evolved an independent personality since the Daleks left Azimuth. Falkus attempts to acquire the Persuasion Machine, a dangerous device that the Seventh Doctor has been tracking with his companions Elizabeth Elizabeth Klein and Will Arrowsmith, but the Doctor is able to trick Falkus into using the reprogrammed Persuasion Machine to destroy himself and his Daleks, while Davros flees in an escape pod. Davros is last shown trapped on the planet Lamuria, faced with the spectral former residents of the planet who sought to punish all criminals in the universe.

By the time of the Eighth Doctor audio play Terror Firma (set after Remembrance), Davros is commanding a Dalek army which has successfully conquered the Earth. His mental instability has grown to the point where "Davros" and "the Emperor" exist within him as different personalities. His Daleks recognise this instability and rebel against Davros. By the story's end the Emperor personality is dominant, and the Daleks agree to follow him and leave Earth.

In the fourth volume of the Time War series, looking at the Eighth Doctor's role in the Time War, after The Valeyard uses a Dalek weapon to erase the Daleks from history, the Dalek Time Strategist escapes the erasure by travelling into a parallel universe where the Kaleds and Thals have been at peace for centuries, with Davros still fully human and married to a Thal woman. The Dalek Time Strategist manipulates this alternate Davros into using his dimensional portal technology to merge various alternate Skaros together to recreate the Daleks in the prime universe, convincing Davros that the Doctor is an enemy of the Kaleds rather than the Thals. Reference is made to the 'prime' Davros having been killed in the first year of the War (as mentioned in "The Stolen Earth"). The process of merging with his alternate selves causes the alternate Davros to gain the injuries and memories of his counterparts, to the extent that he forgets his wife and the peace with the Thals. Eventually his presence restores the Daleks in the prime universe, but the Dalek Emperor has Davros put into stasis to prevent his influence causing another civil war by causing the Daleks to become divided between loyalty to the Emperor and Davros.

=== Novels ===
Terror Firma may contradict the events of the Eighth Doctor Adventures novel War of the Daleks by John Peel, in which an unmerged Davros is placed on trial by the Dalek Prime, a combination of the Dalek Emperor and the Dalek Supreme. In the novel the Dalek Prime claimed that the planet Antalin had been terraformed to resemble Skaro and was destroyed in its place. A subterfuge to destroy Daleks aligned to Davros; both on Skaro (Antalin) and those that remained hidden within Dalek ranks on Skaro (original). Despite finding evidence of threat to Skaro via evidence found on 22nd century earth of Davros' mission to 1960s Earth and seeing the event via time-tracking equipment, the Dalek Prime allowed the destruction of Skaro to destroy Daleks allied to Davros. Dalek Prime also claimed that the Dalek/Movellan war (and indeed most of Dalek history before the destruction of "Skaro") was actually faked for Davros' benefit; in fact another ruse designed to bait Davros into giving evidence against himself (as he does in his trial.) Skaro is later seen to be intact and undamaged, and one character notes that it is quite possible the Dalek Prime is lying in order to weaken Davros' claim to leadership of the Daleks, while using foreknowledge of events to destroy and entrap Davros and his allies.

At the conclusion of War, Davros was seemingly disintegrated by a Spider Dalek on the order of the Dalek Prime. However, Davros had previously recruited one of the Spider Daleks as a sleeper agent for just such an eventuality, and even he was not certain in the end if he was being disintegrated or being teleported away to safety, leaving the possibility open for his return.

=== Short fiction ===
Paul Cornell's dark vignette in the Doctor Who Magazine Brief Encounters series, "An Incident Concerning the Bombardment of the Phobos Colony" occurs sometime between Resurrection of the Daleks and his assumption of the role of Emperor.

=== Theatre ===
In 1993, Michael Wisher, the original Davros, with Peter Miles, who had played his confederate, Nyder, reprised the role in an unlicensed one-off amateur stage production, The Trial of Davros. The plot of the play involved the Time Lords putting Davros on trial, with Nyder as a witness.

Terry Molloy played Davros in the remounting of the play, again with Miles, for another one-off production in 2005. During the production, specially shot footage portrayed Dalek atrocities.

In 2008, Julian Bleach appeared live as Davros at the Doctor Who Prom, announcing that the Royal Albert Hall would become his new palace, and the audience his "obedient slaves".

=== Unofficial BBC representation ===
BBC staff have traditionally created parodies of its own programming to be shown to colleagues at Christmas events and parties. The BBC's 1993 Christmas tape parodied the allegedly robotic, dictatorial and ruthless management style of its then Director-General, John Birt, by portraying him as Davros taking over the BBC, carrying out bizarre mergers of departments, awarding himself a bonus and singing a song to the tune of "I Wan'na Be Like You (The Monkey Song)" describing his plans.

== List of appearances ==
=== Television ===
- Genesis of the Daleks (1975) (played by Michael Wisher)
- Destiny of the Daleks (1979) (played by David Gooderson)
- Resurrection of the Daleks (1984) (debut of Terry Molloy)
- Revelation of the Daleks (1985)
- Remembrance of the Daleks (1988)
- "The Stolen Earth" / "Journey's End" (2008) (debut of Julian Bleach)
- "The Magician's Apprentice" / "The Witch's Familiar" (2015) (Joey Price as young Davros)
- "Destination: Skaro" (2023)

=== Comic strips ===
- Nemesis of the Daleks (Doctor Who Magazine) (implied)
- Emperor of the Daleks (Doctor Who Magazine)
- Up Above the Gods (Doctor Who Magazine)

=== Audio plays ===
Played by Terry Molloy, except where noted.

- Davros
- The Juggernauts
- Terror Firma
- I, Davros: Innocence (young Davros played by Rory Jennings)
- I, Davros: Purity
- I, Davros: Corruption
- I, Davros: Guilt
- The Davros Mission
- Masters of War (Doctor Who Unbound series; outside of default Doctor Who continuity)
- The Curse of Davros
- Daleks Among Us
- Palindrome (alternative Davros)
- Restoration of the Daleks (alternative Davros)
- The War Master: Anti-Genesis (alternative timeline)
- The Dalek Defence

=== Short fiction ===
- "An Incident Concerning the Continual Bombardment of the Phobos Colony" by Paul Cornell, Doctor Who Magazine No. 168

=== Original novels ===
- War of the Daleks by John Peel (Eighth Doctor Adventures)

=== Video games ===
- Dalek Attack
- Lego Dimensions Doctor Who level expansion pack "The Dalek's Extermination of Earth" features Davros and the Daleks as the main antagonists.

=== Theatrical productions ===
- The Trial of Davros, 14 November 1993, 16 July 2005 (played by Michael Wisher in 1993 production, Terry Molloy in 2005 production)
- Doctor Who Prom, 27 July 2008 (played by Julian Bleach)

== Other media ==
On 26 November 2007, a DVD box set was released featuring all of the Davros stories from the shows original run, including Genesis of the Daleks, Destiny of the Daleks, Resurrection of the Daleks, Revelation of the Daleks, and Remembrance of the Daleks.

== See also ==
- The Trial of Davros
- History of the Daleks
- Dalek variants
