= Destination: Skaro =

- Doctor Who charity special

Cast
- Doctor: David Tennant – Fourteenth Doctor
- Others: Julian Bleach – Davros; Nicholas Briggs – Voice of the Dalek; Barnaby Edwards – Dalek operator; Mawaan Rizwan – Mr Castavillian

Production
- Directed by: Jamie Donoughue
- Written by: Russell T Davies
- Produced by: Vicky Delow; Scott Handcock
- Executive producer: Russell T Davies
- Series: 2023 specials
- Running time: 5 minutes
- First broadcast: 17 November 2023

Chronology
← Preceded by "The Power of the Doctor"	Followed by → "The Star Beast"

"Destination: Skaro", also known as "Doctor Who Children in Need Special 2023", is a 5-minute mini-episode of the British science fiction television series Doctor Who. It first aired on 17 November 2023, on BBC One as part of the 2023 Children in Need special. "Destination: Skaro" is the second television appearance of David Tennant as the Fourteenth Doctor and preceded Doctor Who's sixtieth anniversary specials. In the episode, a newly regenerated incarnation of the Doctor mistakenly lands on Skaro at the time Davros is creating the Daleks. It was written by Russell T Davies, the Doctor Who showrunner, and directed by Jamie Donoughue. The special received positive reviews but was met with criticism from some fans for the changes made to Davros.

== Plot ==
On Skaro, Davros unveils his newest creation to Mr. Castavillian, a "travel machine" he describes as the future of the Kaled race. After explaining the numerous features, Castavillian suggests several names for this creation to Davros, all of which are anagrams of Kaled. Davros isn't satisfied with any of the proposed names and briefly exits the room. Sixty minutes after regenerating, the Doctor crash-lands in the TARDIS, destroying part of the original arm meant for the creation. The Doctor initially questions Castavillian as to why his previous face has returned before recognizing the now partially-destroyed creation as a Dalek. Castavillian takes note of the name as the Doctor says he's lucky he wasn't exterminated, a word Castavillian also notes. Realizing he's at the moment Daleks were first created, the Doctor gives Castavillian a plunger to replace its broken arm. The Doctor then departs just as Davros returns. Davros momentarily ponders the modified Dalek and accepts the changes.

== Production ==
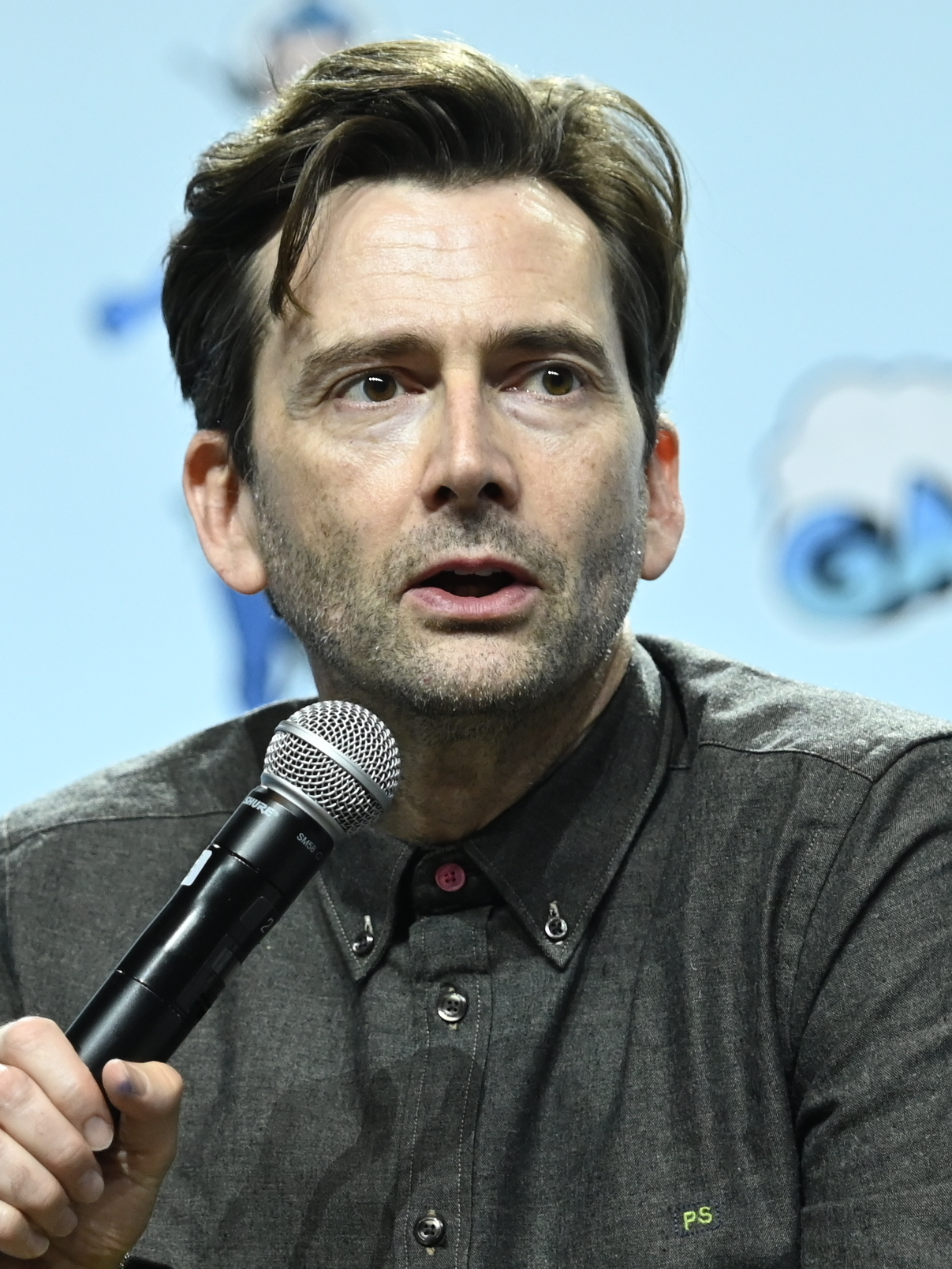
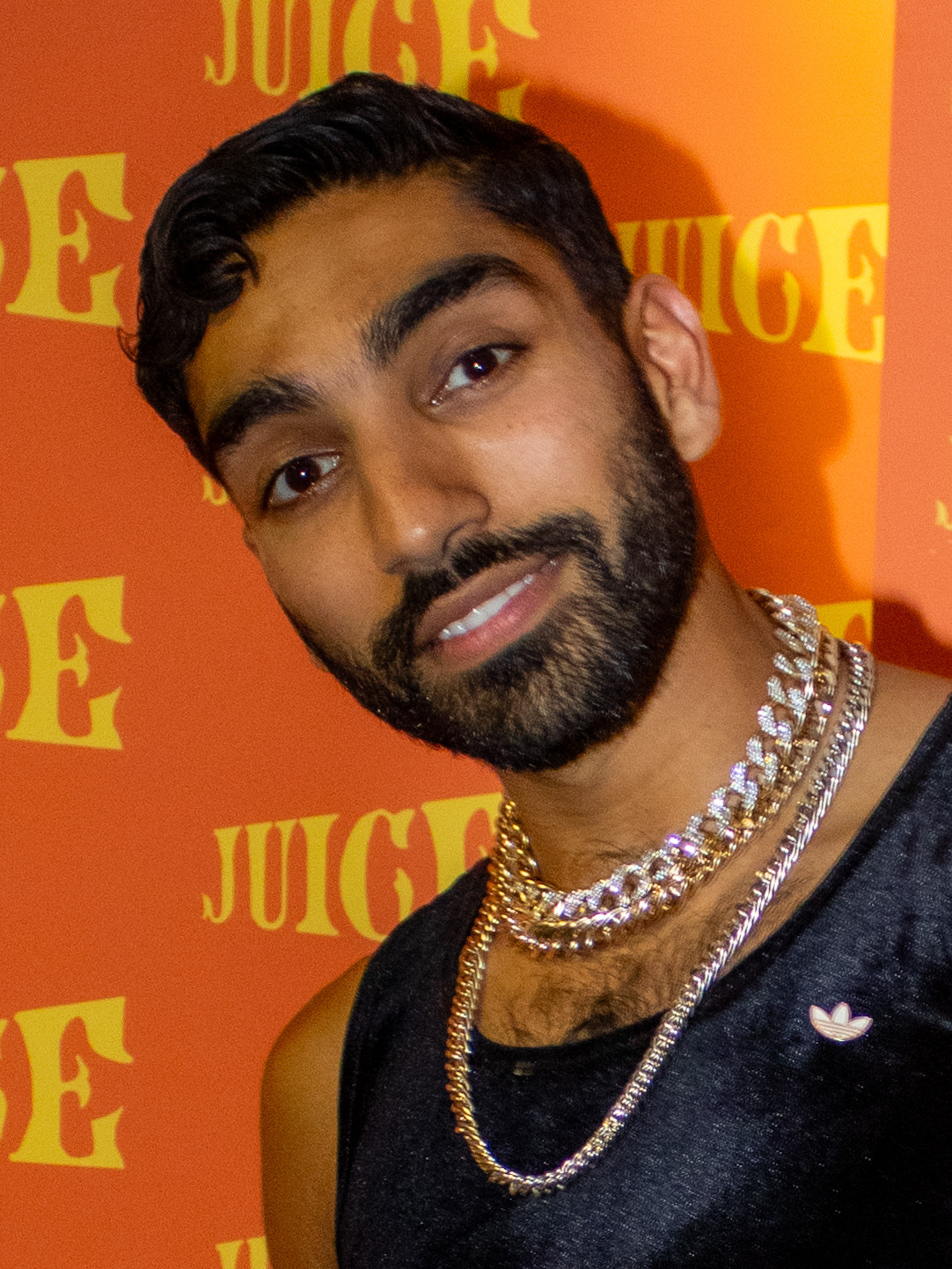
The mini-episode starred David Tennant (left) as the Fourteenth Doctor and Mawaan Rizwan as Mr Castavillian.

Doctor Who showrunner Russell T Davies wrote and executive produced the special which was produced by Vicky Delow and Scott Handcock. Chronologically, it takes place after the Fourteenth Doctor comic Liberation of the Daleks and is an indirect prequel to the 1975 television serial Genesis of the Daleks. It also bridged the gap between "The Power of the Doctor" (2022) and "The Star Beast" (2023). Davros was written to be able-bodied, a change from previous episodes in which the character used a wheelchair and had significant scarring. Davies explained that in any future episodes featuring Davros, he would appear the same way because he and the production team disagreed with common tropes that associated physical disabilities with antagonists.

There's a problem with the Davros of old, in that he's a wheelchair user who is evil. There's a long tradition of associating disability with evil but time, society, culture and taste has moved on. When the world changes, Doctor Who has to change as well. Especially on Children in Need night, when issues of disability and otherness come right to the front of the conversation.

— Russell T Davies

The episode also canonically explains how the Daleks came to have plunger-like devices in their design. Jamie Donoughue directed "Destination: Skaro" which was filmed at Bad Wolf Studios in Cardiff, Wales. Filming occurred on 18 April 2023 while the fourteenth series was in production. The Dalek prop was brought in from Glasgow. David Tennant made his second televised appearance in the special as the Fourteenth Doctor following a brief cameo in "The Power of the Doctor". Tennant filmed the episode on his birthday which was celebrated by the production team. Mawaan Rizwan appeared in the special as Mr Castavillian. Julian Bleach reprised his role as Davros, a character Bleach previously portrayed in 2008 and 2015. Barnaby Edwards returned to operate the Dalek prop which was voiced by Nicholas Briggs. Briggs also provided the voice of Nyder, the character originated by the late Peter Miles in Genesis of the Daleks, briefly heard over the speaker.

== Release and reception ==
=== Broadcast ===
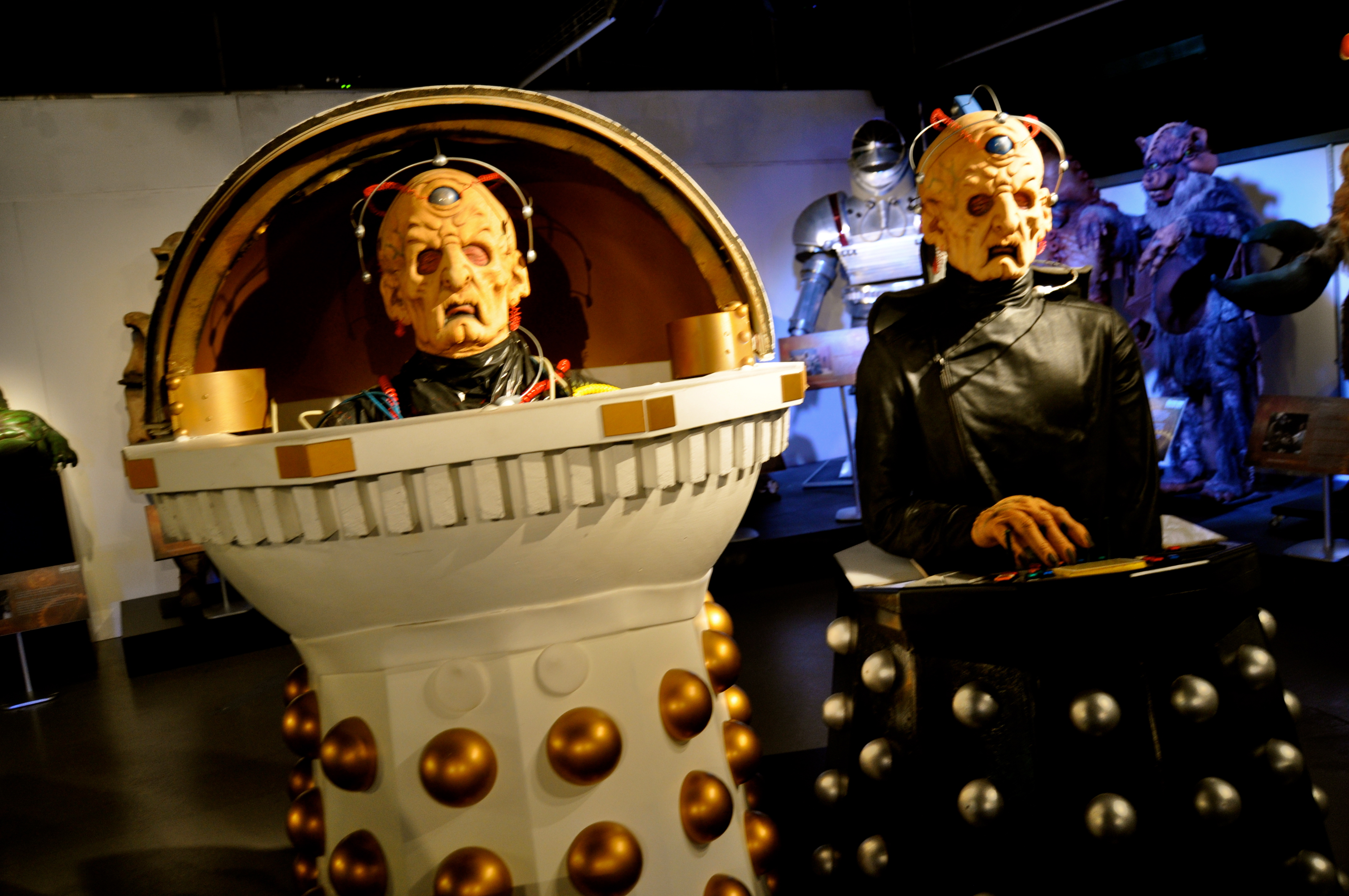
Some fans criticised the episode for turning Davros into an able-bodied character.

"Destination: Skaro" was broadcast on BBC One on 17 November 2023 as part of Children in Need. It was accompanied by an episode of Doctor Who: Unleashed. The full Children in Need special was seen by 3.77 million viewers. A novelisation written by Steve Cole was released on 5 September 2024 as part of The Official Annual 2025 and on 19 September 2024 in Fifteen Doctors 15 Stories as part of the Fourteenth Doctor entry Fleeting Faces.

=== Critical response ===
Reviewing it for Bleeding Cool, Adi Tantimedh rated the episode 10/10 and wrote that the five-minute episode featured what Doctor Who had been missing for five-years under preceding showrunner Chris Chibnall. He went on to call it "consistently surprising and hilarious" and a "masterclass in storytelling and comedy acting". Nerdgazm's Jack Trestrail praised Tennant's performance, writing that he was "energised as ever" and explaining the special was "a real breath of fresh air after 13 months off the air". Trestrail went on to note the differences between Tennant's Tenth Doctor, opining that the Fourteenth felt "more human, and much less filled with rage". The mini-episode received some controversy from fans for retroactively turning Davros into an able-bodied character.
