= Genesis of the Daleks =

078 – Genesis of the Daleks
- Doctor Who serial
- The Doctor questions whether he has the right to commit genocide against the Daleks to prevent them from doing the same to other species in the future. Tom Baker's monologue is considered a pivotal scene in the series.

Cast
- Doctor: Tom Baker – Fourth Doctor
- Companions: Elisabeth Sladen – Sarah Jane Smith; Ian Marter – Harry Sullivan
- Others: Michael Wisher – Davros; Peter Miles – Nyder; Stephen Yardley – Sevrin; Harriet Philpin – Bettan; Dennis Chinnery – Gharman; James Garbutt – Ronson; Guy Siner – Ravon; Jeremy Chandler – Gerrill; Drew Wood – Tane; Andrew Johns – Kravos; Tom Georgeson – Kavell; Ivor Roberts – Mogran; Richard Reeves – Kaled Leader; Peter Mantle – Kaled Guard; Michael Lynch – Thal Politician; Pat Gorman, Hilary Minster, John Gleeson – Thal Soldiers; Max Faulkner – Thal Guard; John Scott Martin, Cy Town, Keith Ashley – Daleks; Roy Skelton – Dalek Voices; John Franklyn-Robbins – Time Lord

Production
- Directed by: David Maloney
- Written by: Terry Nation
- Script editor: Robert Holmes
- Produced by: Philip Hinchcliffe
- Music by: Dudley Simpson
- Production code: 4E
- Series: Season 12
- Running time: 6 episodes, 25 minutes each
- First broadcast: 8 March 1975
- Last broadcast: 12 April 1975

Chronology
| ← Preceded by The Sontaran Experiment | Followed by → Revenge of the Cybermen |

Genesis of the Daleks is the fourth serial of the twelfth season of the British science fiction television series Doctor Who. It was written by Terry Nation and directed by David Maloney, and originally broadcast in six weekly parts from 8 March to 12 April 1975 on BBC1. In the serial, the alien time traveller the Fourth Doctor and his human travelling companions Sarah Jane Smith and Harry Sullivan are directed by the Time Lords to the planet Skaro at the time of the Daleks' creation to prevent them from becoming the dominant race in the universe.

Genesis of the Daleks was originally commissioned under producer Barry Letts and script editor Terrance Dicks, who had asked Nation to write another Dalek story, but believed that the outline submitted was too similar to his previous Dalek adventures and encouraged him to explore their origins. The story introduces the Daleks' creator, Davros, who had a unique visual design. Letts and Dicks handed the original script to their successors, producer Philip Hinchcliffe and script editor Robert Holmes, who made changes which gave it a darker tone. Nation, having intentionally modelled the Daleks on the Nazis, further explored the theme in Genesis. It also addresses the moral issues that come with time travel and genocide.

The story was filmed over January and February 1975, with some location filming in a quarry in Betchworth. Genesis of the Daleks premiered with 10.7 million viewers and concluded five weeks later with 9.1 million, with the least-watched episode being Part Three with 8.5 million viewers. Since its broadcast the serial has been widely praised as one of the series' best.

== Plot ==
The Doctor and his companions are intercepted by the Time Lords, who instruct the Doctor to interfere with the creation of the Daleks. The Doctor is given a Time Ring which will return him and his companions to the TARDIS when the mission is complete.

The three find themselves on the planet of Skaro. A generations-long war between the Thals and the Kaleds has left the planet inhospitable; except for their two domes. An attack separates them; Sarah meets the Mutos, mutated exiles of both sides, but then are all captured by the Thals. The Doctor and Harry are captured by the Kaleds, their possessions confiscated, and are taken to a bunker to meet the scientific and military elite, including the lead scientist Davros, who unveils the "Mark III travel machine", or "Dalek". Ronson, one of the scientists, secretly tells the Doctor that Davros' experiments are unethical, and the Doctor convinces the leadership to halt them. Learning of Ronson's actions, Davros covertly provides the Thal leaders a chemical formula that can weaken the Kaled dome.

The Doctor and Harry reach the Thal dome and rescue Sarah. A missile strikes the Kaled dome, killing all those not in the bunker; it is revealed that Davros gave the details to the Thals so that he could dispose of those Kaleds who opposed him. Davros accuses Ronson of being the traitor, orders the Daleks to kill him, and convinces the leadership to have his Daleks attack the Thals. The attack kills many Thals; the Doctor, his companions, and the survivors make their way to the bunker and the Doctor instructs them to find a way to destroy it while he and his companions go inside.

Davros captures the Doctor; the other scientists, now aware of his plans, free the Doctor, who then rigs the Dalek incubation room with explosives. As he is about to touch the two exposed wire ends to set them off, he hesitates, questioning whether he has the right to make that decision.

He is relieved to learn that Davros has agreed to allow a vote on the project. The Doctor recovers the Time Ring; as the vote is called, the Daleks return and exterminate the remaining Kaleds. Harry and Sarah escape, while the Doctor returns to set off the explosives, but a Dalek inadvertently sets it off itself. The Doctor escapes before the Thal and Mutos' bomb caves in the bunker, trapping Davros and the Daleks, who then refuse to take orders from a non-Dalek and seemingly exterminate Davros. While he suspects he has only managed to set back Dalek evolution somewhat, the Doctor considers his mission complete: out of the Daleks' evil, good will always arise to challenge them. He and his companions say goodbye to the survivors and use the Time Ring to return to the TARDIS.

== Production ==
=== Conception and writing ===
When planning stories for season 12, producer Barry Letts and script editor Terrance Dicks felt that it was time for Terry Nation to return to the series and write another Dalek adventure. Letts and Dicks enjoyed the script Nation sent in, but found it too "reminiscent" of many of his previous Dalek stories. The two suggested that Nation instead write an origin story for the Daleks, originally titled Daleks – Genesis of Terror. The serial was commissioned on 1 April 1974, and the scripts accepted on 22 July. The stories lined up for the season were handed over to Letts and Dicks' successors, producer Philip Hinchcliffe and script editor Robert Holmes, with whom Genesis of the Daleks gained a darker tone. Holmes was not keen on frequent appearances by the Daleks, and only allowed the story because it explored their origins. In an aim to make the series more adult, Hinchcliffe wanted the story to be "pacy" and make the Daleks appear more powerful. In a 2006 interview, Dicks said that he does not believe the story would have been much different if he and Letts had been in charge, though he remarked he would have added some lighter moments to soften the "grim" tone. Director David Maloney stated that the images of war at the beginning of the serial were intended to create atmosphere, and he had no intention of losing the younger audience.

The production of Genesis of the Daleks saw several changes from the script. Maloney altered the opening scene to show the soldiers gunned down by machine guns in slow motion. Nation was displeased with the change, and Maloney later felt that the violent addition was "a bit much". Hinchcliffe and Maloney were not keen on the Doctor's original meeting with the Time Lord, which took place in a lush garden, and changed it to the Skaro war-zone which they felt more appropriate. The Thal soldiers were originally supposed to be boys aged 15 or 16 to illustrate the youth of those fighting in the war, but this was later changed to make them appear more mature. In the Genesis of Terror script, Sarah Jane becomes ill in the third episode from radiation poisoning, and Bettan was a male who was introduced in the fourth episode. Part Five originally had more action in the Dalek incubator room and ended with the Doctor's question of whether he had the right to destroy them.

=== Casting and costumes ===
The talent on Genesis was extraordinary. David Spode's sets were incredible, Sylvia and Barbara achieved wonders with makeup and costume, and then there were the actors [...] – all excellent. But the star of the show, I have to say, was Michael Wisher.

— Elisabeth Sladen on Genesis of the Daleks in her autobiography.

Maloney cast John Franklyn-Robbins as the Time Lord because he had worked with him before and intended his character to resemble Death in The Seventh Seal. Hilary Minster, who played a Thal soldier, had also played a Thal in Planet of the Daleks (1973). Minster had been considered for the role of Mogran. Peter Miles previously played Dr. Lawrence in Doctor Who and the Silurians (1970) and Professor Whitaker in Invasion of the Dinosaurs (1974). Stephen Yardley, who played the Muto Sevrin, later appeared in Vengeance on Varos (1985). During filming of Genesis, Yardley walked into the casting department on his lunch break in costume and asked for a job; because of his costume, they assumed he was a tramp from the street. Dennis Chinnery, who played Gharman, had previously been seen in The Chase (1965) and would later appear in The Twin Dilemma (1984).

The character of Davros was designed by Nation to have created the Daleks in his image, and to also be a "spokesperson" for the Daleks as he felt it was "boring" listening to Daleks giving speeches. The design was inspired by the Mekon, a comic book character with a small body and a large "green, dome-like head" which Hinchcliffe remembered from his childhood. Davros attracted the attention of BBC prosthetics designer John Friedlander who agreed to come off another show to make Davros' mask. The latex mask was moulded to Michael Wisher's face by make-up artist Sylvia James. Wisher could even eat while wearing the mask. Regular latex instead of the more mouldable foam latex was used because the latter was too expensive. The cast and crew regarded Davros' effects as a great technical achievement considering the budget and time period they worked in. Two children visiting Baker at the BBC studios were scared by Wisher in costume; they thought he was a statue at first. When sitting in Davros' Dalek-like base, Wisher wore knee pads and a kilt because trousers were too uncomfortable. To prepare during rehearsals, Wisher acted in a wheelchair with a paper bag over his head that only had slits cut out for his eyes so he would be used to the "disorienting" situation and be able to express himself without using his whole face. Wisher, a heavy smoker, put two holes in the top of the bag so he could smoke underneath it in rehearsals. Wisher also provided some of the voices for the Daleks with Roy Skelton; in some scenes, he was acting to his own pre-recorded dialogue. Stuntman and actor Terry Walsh appeared uncredited in several roles.

=== Filming and effects ===
This serial marks the first appearance of Davros (pictured here in the cliffhanger to "Part One"), who would become a major antagonist in the series going forward.

Genesis of the Daleks was the last serial of the twelfth season to be filmed, after Revenge of the Cybermen. As Sarah Jane had been filmed in Revenge wearing a combat costume, it was added into Genesis that the Doctor would hand her the outfit, into which she changes by the next scene. The story was mainly filmed in January 1975, with some studio recording carried into February. Location filming for the serial took place at Betchworth quarry in Surrey, which represented the landscape of Skaro. Having had trouble with the Daleks on location in Planet of the Daleks (1973), Maloney scheduled shooting so that they only appeared in studio scenes. The three active Dalek props used in the serial were originals from the 1960s, and their wear was covered by new paint. Five "dummy" Daleks which could not be operated were also used. Hinchcliffe wanted the Daleks to appear more powerful, and intended to achieve this through low angles and lighting. Duncan Brown, who was responsible for studio lighting, used colours and dark lighting to make the Daleks seem as if they were "emerging from the shadows" and to suggest rather than show the world created to viewers.

The same model was used for both the Kaled and the Thal domes. The gas attack in Part One was achieved through dry ice and green lighting. Some of the Thal guns were reused props from the First Doctor (William Hartnell) serial Galaxy 4 (1965). The electric trolley used by the Kaleds in Part One worked in tests, but collapsed when Baker and Marter boarded it. The creature Harry and the Doctor glimpse at the end of Part Two was mainly a reused Ice Warrior costume, while the Thal rocket ship was a reused model from The Ambassadors of Death (1970). During the filming of Part Two, Miles and Chinnery had trouble fitting the gun on the Dalek. As a result, the scene had to be filmed in two takes, bridged with a reaction shot of the Doctor. Part Two is unusual in that it is one of the very few episodes not to begin with a reprise, and also the first to end in a freeze frame. A stunt double for Elisabeth Sladen was hired for Sarah's fall from the scaffolding, but Maloney discovered that she would be falling eight feet, while Sladen had fallen ten feet in rehearsals. Maloney ultimately decided to conclude the episode with a freeze frame ending. Maloney would use the freeze frame technique again, most notably with The Deadly Assassin. The third episode overran its 25-minute limit and rather than cut material out the cliffhanger was changed from Davros' speech to the Doctor being electrocuted. The music for the serial was recorded on 3 March 1975 and the dubbing finished the day before Part One aired.

== Themes and analysis ==
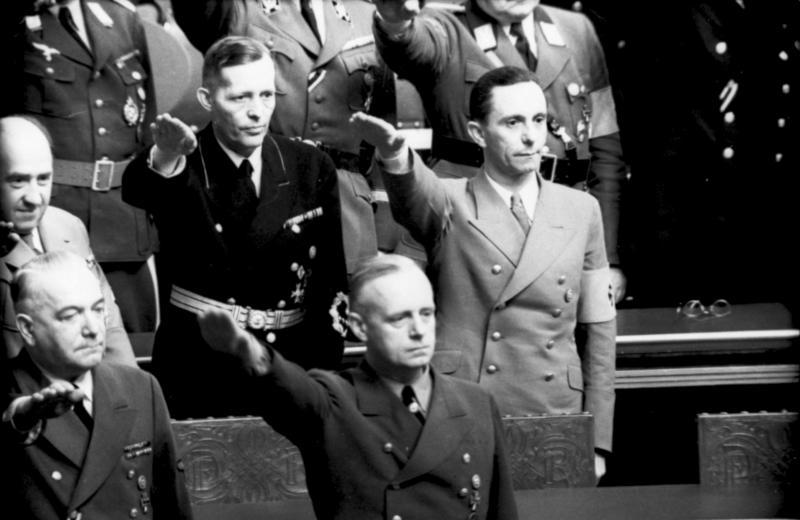
German Nazis, on whom the Kaleds in the serial were intentionally based.

Nation, who grew up during World War II, intentionally based the Daleks on the Nazis, and this episode contains many deliberate parallels. The Kaleds dress in uniforms reminiscent of the Nazis and display "fascist salutes". The Kaleds look to "keep [their] race pure" by banishing the Thals and Mutos. Cast and crew members described it as a "warning to the world" about the danger of allowing authoritarianism to take over. Davros has been likened to Nazi dictator Adolf Hitler several times, while physical comparisons have also been drawn between the appearance of Nyder and SS chief Heinrich Himmler; aside from the resemblance, both wear similar uniforms and spectacles. As production of the third episode began, the producers decided to play down some of the Nazi symbolism, and took away Nyder's Iron Cross. It briefly reappears in a later scene that was filmed in the first recording block.

Ed Webb and Mark Wardecker, in a paper in Doctor Who and Philosophy, interpreted the Dalek history shown in Genesis of the Daleks as a warning that "scientists will be the one to bring about the ultimate destruction, the ultimate evil, and deliberately so". They also commented that the serial showed that the Daleks were evil by design, rather than evolution. Davros represents a mad scientist who creates a monster that then consumes him. Sarah Honeychurch and Niall Barr, in the same book, wrote that the corruption of the Daleks showed that creatures should not be created with "such limited moral reasoning," and that in our world we cannot "impose our own personal human standards on everybody else".

Genesis of the Daleks also displays a battle between good and evil. Letts enjoyed the fact that the story did not have clear heroes and villains, but rather a conflict of principle. The discussion between the Doctor and Davros about the hypothetical viral weapon demonstrates this. Hinchcliffe described it as the "hero meets antihero" moment, with the two engaged in "intellectual grappling". The episode also presents the "moral dilemma" of whether the Doctor should destroy the Daleks, resulting in the famous "Do I have the right?" scene. The Doctor's comparison to knowingly killing a child who would grow up to be a dictator shows how the Doctor's ethics are influenced by his non-linear experience of time. He considers the good things that may come out of the Daleks, such as that "many future worlds would become allies". The Doctor's conclusion that he does not have the right is an example of utilitarian reasoning, and a "duty-based ethical" position. Sladen recalled that Baker took the scene very seriously, almost "agonising" over the dialogue. Critics have noted that the scene, considered pivotal in the series' history, relies more on the screenplay and Baker's performance rather than high-budget special effects or "explosions".

Comparisons to other stories have been drawn. The Time Lord who appears at the story's beginning is intentionally costumed to resemble Death in Ingmar Bergman's film The Seventh Seal. Gareth Roberts has compared this character to the ghost of Hamlet's father, setting the protagonist (the Doctor) on a violent mission with which he has moral qualms. Martin Wiggins, senior lecturer and fellow at the Shakespeare Institute at Stratford-upon-Avon, suggests that the Doctor's indecision about destroying the Dalek embryos in the "do I have the right?" scene is derived from The Brothers Karamazov.

== Broadcast and reception ==
| Episode | Title | Run time | Original release date | UK viewers (millions) |
|---|---|---|---|---|
| 1 | "Part One" | 24:30 | 8 March 1975 | 10.7 |
| 2 | "Part Two" | 24:51 | 15 March 1975 | 10.5 |
| 3 | "Part Three" | 22:38 | 22 March 1975 | 8.5 |
| 4 | "Part Four" | 23:38 | 29 March 1975 | 8.8 |
| 5 | "Part Five" | 23:27 | 5 April 1975 | 9.8 |
| 6 | "Part Six" | 23:30 | 12 April 1975 | 9.1 |

Genesis of the Daleks was first broadcast in six weekly parts from 8 March to 12 April 1975. Viewership varied from 8.5 to 10.7 million; Parts One and Two were watched by audiences of 10.7 and 10.5 million, Parts Three and Four were watched by audiences of 8.5 and 8.8 million, and Parts Five and Six were watched by audiences of 9.8 and 9.1 million. Audience Appreciation Indexes were taken for the second, fourth, fifth, and sixth episodes, scoring 57, 58, 57, and 56 respectively.

At the time of broadcast, there were some complaints about the level of violence portrayed. Mary Whitehouse, of the National Viewers' and Listeners' Association, complained that Genesis contained "tea-time brutality for tots". Scenes objected to included the depictions of war and Nyder striking the Doctor. David J. Howe and Stephen James Walker, in their Doctor Who: The Television Companion (1998), recorded a positive reaction from fans in regards to creativity and Davros, though one writer noted the ending did not satisfyingly close the story. The BBC's Audience Research Report concluded, "A little more complex than some Doctor Who adventures, perhaps, and with underlying questions of conscience, the serial had been 'different' it was occasionally felt and, although dismissed in some quarters as far-fetched, long drawn-out, confused and/or predictable, had provided acceptable escapist entertainment for the majority." Howe and Walker themselves described the serial as "well-written and full of new ideas, while still remaining true to the Daleks' roots by effectively equating them with the Nazis", and particularly praised the production values, pacing, and moral dilemma. They considered it to have a few minor flaws, namely Harry being attacked by a giant clam, some "duff" cliffhangers, and "many of the scientist characters serve no other purpose than to act as Dalek-fodder".

In 2010, Mark Braxton of Radio Times awarded the serial a full five stars and hailed it as "Terry Nation's finest hour for the series", suggesting that Davros was "the greatest villain in Doctor Who history". He was also positive towards Dudley Simpson's score and Davros's allies, who were "impeccably written and played" from Nyder to Gharman, but was disappointed that Harry did not have much to do. The A.V. Club reviewer Christopher Bahn noted that it contradicted some aspects of The Daleks but that it "[hit] the emotional target dead-on". He particularly praised Davros and Skaro, but considered the "major problem" with the portrayal of the Daleks was that "we're not given any choice but to view them as psychopathic murderers", and the Doctor came across as a "catastrophically incompetent secret agent". DVD Talk's Stuart Galbraith gave Genesis of the Daleks four out of five stars, calling it a "real fan-pleaser" and writing that Wisher was "superb" as Davros. While noting that the story "is mostly concerned with action and suspense, which it does rather well", he wrote that it "isn't especially original" as it dealt with common time-travel issues, despite doing it in "intelligent ways". In 2009, SFX listed the scene where the Daleks receive their first blaster as the thirteenth scariest moment of Doctor Who. The magazine also named the scene where Harry is attacked by a giant clam as one of the silliest Doctor Who moments, noting "even the best Doctor Who stories have the occasional dropped stitch". Charlie Jane Anders of io9, in a 2010 article, listed the cliffhanger of Episode Four – in which the Doctor is forced to tell Davros how the Daleks will be defeated in the future – as one of the greatest Doctor Who cliffhangers.

Writing for BFI Screenonline, James Donohue thought Genesis of the Daleks "shows the series developing a more complex appreciation of the moral issues surrounding being a monster", but "the plot contrives to prevent the Doctor from having to make the difficult decision himself anyway. He delays Davros' plans, but he does not change the future. Lacking the courage to answer the questions it raises, Genesis shows how challenging, and how infuriating, children's TV can be."

=== Legacy ===
Genesis of the Daleks is one of the most widely known serials of the original run as it was repeated often. It was edited into an 85-minute omnibus version and broadcast on BBC1 at 3:00 pm on 27 December 1975, attracting 7.6 million viewers, and also was repeated in two edited 45-minute episodes as part of the "Doctor Who and the Monsters" season on 26 July and 2 August 1982, which attracted audiences of 4.9 and 5 million. It was then repeated in its original serial form on BBC Two in 1993 (averaging 2.2 million viewers) and 2000 (averaging 1 to 1.5 million). In a 1998 poll of readers of Doctor Who Magazine, over 2500 voters placed Genesis at the top of a poll to find the greatest Doctor Who stories of all time. In the magazine's 2009 "Mighty 200" poll, asking readers to rank all of the then-made 200 stories, Genesis came in third place, behind The Caves of Androzani (1984) and "Blink" (2007). In a 2014 poll, the magazine's readers again placed the episode in third place. In 2008, The Daily Telegraph named Genesis of the Daleks one of the ten greatest episodes of Doctor Who.

Genesis of the Daleks is the first example in the history of Doctor Who of "outright revisionism"; the creation story of the Daleks is very different from that established in The Daleks (1963), where it was said they evolved from creatures known as Dals, who were once similar to the Thals. Here, the Dals from the original story are changed to Kaleds. The Official Doctor Who and the Daleks Book, co-authored by Terry Nation, suggested that The Daleks took place during the Daleks' 1000-year hibernation following Genesis of the Daleks, and that the Daleks seen in that story were the descendants of Kaled mutants who had sought refuge in the destroyed Kaled city and discovered Davros' prototypes and notes. Russell T Davies, who revived Doctor Who in 2005, suggested that the origins of the Time War, a conflict between the Time Lords and the Daleks which contributed to the storyline of the new series, began with the Time Lords' attempted genocide of the Daleks in Genesis.

Davros is resurrected in Destiny of the Daleks (1979), played by David Gooderson, and appears in the remaining three Dalek stories of the classic series played by Terry Molloy. He has also appeared in the revived series since "The Stolen Earth"/"Journey's End" (2008), played by Julian Bleach. In "The Magician's Apprentice" (2015), footage from the episode is used with its plot based on the Fourth Doctor's moral issue if one has the right to kill a child if they knew "that child would grow up totally evil." Davros' early life is additionally covered in the 2006 Big Finish Productions four-part audio series I, Davros, which saw Miles reprising his role as Nyder in the fourth episode, "Guilt".

== Commercial releases ==
=== In print ===
Doctor Who and the Genesis of the Daleks
- Author: Terrance Dicks
- Cover artist: Chris Achilleos
- Series: Doctor Who book: Target novelisations
- Release number: 27
- Publisher: Target Books
- Publication date: 22 July 1976
- ISBN: 0-426-11260-1

The Target novelisation of this serial, written by Terrance Dicks, was published by Tandem in 1976. It was re-released by Virgin Publishing in 1991, bearing its designated number of 27 in the novelisation range. The Genesis of the Daleks novelisation has the largest print run of any of the original series, selling over 100,000 copies.

=== Home media ===
In 1979, the BBC released a condensed audio version of the serial as an LP. In 1988, this recording was reissued on cassette by BBC Audio alongside a later radio play, Slipback. It was subsequently released on CD in a revised and expanded version by BBC Audio paired with Exploration Earth: The Time Machine in 2001. In February 2011, Audio Go reissued the one-hour condensed audio version of the LP as part of their "Vintage Beeb" range.

Genesis of the Daleks was released on VHS by BBC Enterprises in 1991 with The Sontaran Experiment, and again as part of a box set of stories featuring Davros in 2001. It was released on DVD as a two-disc special edition in the United Kingdom by BBC Worldwide on 10 April 2006 and in the United States by Warner Home Video on 6 June 2006. This DVD is also available as part of the limited edition 2007 release of The Complete Davros Collection box set along with Destiny of the Daleks, Resurrection of the Daleks, Revelation of the Daleks and Remembrance of the Daleks.

A 1080i upscaled remaster of the story was released on Blu-ray in the United Kingdom by BBC Studios as part of the 'Complete Season 12' box set on 11 June 2018, and in the United States by Warner Home Video (as 'Tom Baker: Season One') on 19 June 2018; This release contained both the original 6-episode version and the 85-minute abridged repeat. To promote the release, the repeat version (marketed as a 'Director's Cut') was screened theatrically in the United States via Fathom Events on 11 June 2018.

In November 2020, the story was released as part of the Time Lord Victorious: Road to the Dark Times Blu-ray, along with Planet of the Daleks, The Deadly Assassin, State of Decay, The Curse of Fenric, "The Runaway Bride" and "The Waters of Mars".

On 1 November 2023, for the programme's 60th anniversary, Genesis of the Daleks became available to stream on BBC iPlayer. It is available internationally on BritBox.
