= Dennis Chinnery =

British actor (1927–2012)

- in Doctor Who: Genesis of the Daleks (1975)
- Born: Dennis Arthur Robert Chinnery; 14 May 1927; Essex, England
- Died: 29 February 2012 (aged 84); Hampshire, England
- Education: RADA
- Occupation: Actor
- Spouse(s): Dawn Chinnery (m. 1947–1998) Pat Kerr (m. 2000)

Dennis Chinnery (14 May 1927 – 29 February 2012) was a British actor, noted for his performances in television.

Following National service in the navy, he studied acting at RADA, graduating in 1949. His theatre work included appearances at the Old Vic.

His TV credits include: Hancock's Half Hour, Dixon of Dock Green, Z-Cars, Softly, Softly, The Saint, The Avengers, The Prisoner, The Champions, Public Eye, Special Branch, Oh, Brother!, The Laughter of a Fool, Thriller and Survivors.

He also appeared in three Doctor Who serials - The Chase, Genesis of the Daleks and The Twin Dilemma. The character Dr Chinnery in The League of Gentlemen was named after him. He was born at Romford, Essex, to Arthur F Chinnery and his wife Dorothy (née Mills).

Chinnery was also an artist and painter.

== Partial filmography ==
- Three Steps to the Gallows (1953) - Bill Adams, 2nd Officer
- Escape by Night (1953) - Reporter (uncredited)
- The Embezzler (1954) - Bank Clerk
- Delayed Action (1954) - Bank cashier
- Hour of Decision (1957) - Studio Photographer
- The Plague of the Zombies (1966) - Constable Christian
- The Body Stealers (1969) - 1st Control Officer
- Crossplot (1969) - First reporter
- All the Way Up (1970) - Makepiece's Chauffeur
- Percy (1971) - Newsreader (uncredited)
- Lady Killers (1981) – Albert Burton
- Bullseye! (1990) - 2nd Vault Guard
