= The Trial of Davros =

The Trial of Davros is a theatrical production featuring characters from the long-running British BBC science fiction television programme Doctor Who. It was written by Kevin Taylor and Michael Wisher for Hyde Fundraisers, a group of science fiction fans who make and appear in replica costumes from TV series and films such as Doctor Who and Star Wars to raise funds for various charities. The play was performed twice; in 1993 and 2005. The second production was performed with the agreement and backing of both the BBC and the estate of screenwriter Terry Nation, the creator of the Davros character.

== Synopsis ==
The action takes place within the immediate continuity of the Doctor Who serial Genesis of the Daleks. As Davros' creations, the Daleks, prepare to kill him at the conclusion of that story he is removed from time by the Time Lords to be tried for his crimes. The case against him includes personal testimony and evidence of Dalek atrocities throughout the centuries. Ultimately it is revealed that the trial has been a ruse by Davros to create a time portal to Gallifrey, enabling his new Daleks to attack and exterminate the Time Lords. The play ends with Davros and his Daleks victorious.

== The 1993 production ==
The play was performed on 14 November 1993 at "Remembrance '93", a Doctor Who convention held at The Village Hotel, Hyde, Greater Manchester. It was produced by Nigel Peever, with the cast including Michael Wisher (Davros), Jean Rogers (Note: Jean Rogers IMDb Listing) (Inquisitor), Keith Noble (Prosecutor), Stuart Glazebrook (Prosecutor) and Peter Miles (Nyder).

== The 2005 production ==
The play was performed on 16 July 2005 at the Tameside Hippodrome theatre, Ashton-under-Lyne, as part of the "Ashton Sci-Fi Weekend" and to mark the 20th anniversary of Hyde Fundraisers. The original 1993 script was expanded with additional material by Kevin Taylor, contributions from Terry Molloy, and a new scene written by Michael Wisher. The production also included filmed sequences created for the production by the Hyde Fundraisers team, referencing the Doctor Who serials The Dalek Invasion of Earth, Day of the Daleks, Frontier in Space, and Death to the Daleks.

The cast included Terry Molloy (Davros), Andrew Wisher (Note: Andrew Wisher IMDb Listing) (Prosecutor 1), John Leeson (Prosecutor 2), Jeremy Bulloch (Chairman Skellon), Hylton Collins (Note: Hylton Collins IMDb Listing) (The Lord President), Katarina Olsson (Note: Katarina Olsson IMDb Listing) (Shan), Brian Miller (Wiston) and Peter Miles (Nyder). The Davros mask was created by sculptor Phil Robinson, who also provided the masks and prosthetics for the Exillon, Ogron and Draconian alien creatures seen in the filmed sections of the production.

== Cast notes ==
Although produced by a voluntary group established to raise funds for charity, the plays are notable for the casting of professional actors in the major roles. In particular Michael Wisher and Terry Molloy had portrayed Davros in the Doctor Who television series, while Peter Miles reprised his role as Nyder from Genesis of the Daleks in both productions.

== See also ==
- History of the Daleks
- Dalek variants
