= Doctor Who Prom (2008) =

2008 concert

Prom 13: Doctor Who Prom
- Title card from BBC One broadcast
- Series: The BBC Proms
- Running time: 95 minutes
- First broadcast: BBC Radio 3: 27 July 2008; BBC One & BBC HD: 1 January 2009

Chronology
← Preceded by Doctor Who: A Celebration	Followed by → Doctor Who Prom (2010)

Prom 13: Doctor Who Prom was a concert showcasing incidental music from the British science fiction television series Doctor Who, along with classical music, performed on 27 July 2008 in the Royal Albert Hall in London as part of the BBC's annual Proms series of concerts. The Doctor Who Prom was the thirteenth concert in the 2008 Proms season, and was intended to introduce young children to the Proms.

The Doctor Who Prom showcased the work of Murray Gold, who has composed the incidental music for Doctor Who since its return in 2005. Other classical pieces were also played. The concert was conducted by Ben Foster and Stephen Bell, and performed by the BBC Philharmonic. It was presented by actress Freema Agyeman, who played companion Martha Jones on Doctor Who. Other Doctor Who actors and performers dressed as Doctor Who monsters also made appearances on stage and in the audience. The concert included video montages of scenes from Doctor Who and a specially filmed "mini-episode" of Doctor Who called "Music of the Spheres", which was presented on a screen above the orchestra and included live interactive elements.

The Doctor Who Prom was broadcast live on BBC Radio 3 and recorded for subsequent television broadcast on BBC One on 1 January 2009. It was positively reviewed in several newspapers.

The success of the 2008 Prom led to more Doctor Who Proms for the 2010, 2013 and 2024 Proms seasons.

== Development and purpose ==
In 2006, the Doctor Who production team had presented a concert titled "Doctor Who: A Celebration" at the Wales Millennium Centre in Cardiff, as a fundraiser for Children in Need. The success of that concert encouraged Doctor Who producer Julie Gardner and David Jackson (then Head of Music at BBC Wales) to meet the Director of the BBC Proms, Roger Wright, and suggest a Doctor Who-themed Proms concert. The Doctor Who Prom replaced the Blue Peter Prom, which had been held from 1998 to 2007.

The Doctor Who Prom was part of an ongoing drive to make the Proms more accessible and inclusive. Some critics accused Wright of "dumbing down" the Proms, against which Wright defended the programme, pointing out that "we're hosting a concert for families that include pieces by Holst, Wagner and Prokofiev."

Gardner and Doctor Who producer Russell T Davies decided to create a "mini-episode" of Doctor Who to be shown during the concert, in part because actor David Tennant, who played the Doctor, was unable to participate in the live concert due to his commitments to the Royal Shakespeare Company's production of Hamlet. Davies incorporated interactive elements into his script to ensure that the live performance was "an event":

You can watch it later on the website, or on YouTube, or whatever, but frankly, you'll never know what it was really like unless you are in the Albert Hall on that day. It can never be captured again. And that's a reward for people who buy tickets and queue and travel.

— Russell T Davies

The official price for pre-booked tickets was £10 for adults and £5 for children. These tickets sold out, and 3,000 people signed up for a waiting list in the event of any cancellations. Prior to the concert, tickets were touted on eBay for up to £250. As at all Proms concerts, 500 tickets were sold for £5 on the day of the event. The queue for £5 tickets for the Doctor Who Prom began at 5:00 in the morning. 6,000 people attended the sold-out concert. The audience included many families with children, as well as older Doctor Who fans. The Times described the concert as the "most over-subscribed concert" of the Proms season.

== Programme ==
In addition to the Doctor Who music by Murray Gold, several classical pieces were included in the concert, including one piece which had its United Kingdom début. Julie Gardner told Doctor Who Magazine that the concert's planners considered a theme of "time and space" to tie in with Doctor Who, but decided that this "would lead to using the big sci-fi tracks from the likes of 2001, which would make the concert feel too much like a 'film and TV soundtrack day'." Instead, the producers chose "the Doctor's love of humanity" as a theme, and selected pieces which they felt connected with that theme.

=== Act One ===
Composer	Title	Time	Description
Murray Gold	"Concert Prologue"	1:30	"Concert Prologue" is made up from Gold's "The Doctor's Theme" and features a soloist (Melanie Pappenheim) backed by orchestra. "The Doctor's Theme" was heard first in the Doctor Who episode "Rose" (2005) and has been used as a regular motif in Gold's scores for numerous episodes since.
Aaron Copland	"Fanfare for the Common Man"	2:54	Composed in 1942, "Fanfare for the Common Man" was premièred by the Cincinnati Symphony Orchestra in 1943.
Murray Gold	"All the Strange, Strange Creatures"	4:00	Parts of "All the Strange, Strange Creatures" were used in the trailers for Series 3 of Doctor Who (2007). Arrangements of it featured in the scores for the Doctor Who episodes such as "Gridlock" (2007), "The Sound of Drums" (2007) and "Journey's End" (2008). During the Prom performance, performers dressed as Cybermen, Judoon, Sontarans, and Ood appeared on stage and in the audience.
Sergey Prokofiev	Romeo and Juliet – "Montagues and Capulets"	4:43	"Montagues and Capulets" features in Act 1 of Prokofiev's ballet Romeo and Juliet based on William Shakespeare's play Romeo and Juliet. It was composed in the mid-1930s and since 2005 has become associated with television series The Apprentice; according to The Times' reviewer, Caitlin Moran, the recognition of this piece as "the music from The Apprentice" went "round the room like a Mexican wave."
Murray Gold	"The Doctor Forever"	4:30	"The Doctor Forever" was first heard in Doctor Who episode "The Runaway Bride" (2006) and was used extensively throughout Series 3 (2007) and Series 4 (2008). It begins as a "celestial anthem for solo vocal and then choir, backed by strings...[and] becomes an out-and-out adventure theme."
Murray Gold	"Rose"	1:30	Written for the Ninth Doctor's companion Rose Tyler, "Rose" (also known as "Rose's Theme") was first heard in Doctor Who episode "The End of the World" (2005). Extracts from "Rose" have been used in numerous episodes since with the melody becoming "one of the series' strongest musical identities".
Murray Gold	"Martha vs The Master"	4:30	"Martha vs The Master" was composed for Doctor Who episode "Last of the Time Lords" (2007) which saw the Tenth Doctor's companion Martha Jones save the world from the Master. It includes the Master's theme, as well as sequences from the themes of other characters from the series, notably that of Martha Jones.
"Music of the Spheres" – specially filmed scene
Interval

=== Act Two ===
Composer	Title	Time	Description
Richard Wagner	Die Walküre – "The Ride of the Valkyries"	4:40	"The Ride of the Valkyries" was written about Nordic goddesses transporting fallen heroes to open Act 3 of Wagner's opera Die Walküre and was first performed in 1870. It is well known for its use in scores for films such as Apocalypse Now.
Murray Gold	"The Daleks and Davros"	8:12	"The Daleks and Davros" comprises music that has underscored the Daleks, the Dalek Emperor and Davros in various appearances since Series 1 of Doctor Who (2005). The suite features the choir and orchestra performing music from episodes "Bad Wolf" (2005) and "Doomsday" (2006) and a march from "The Stolen Earth" (2008) before continuing with music from "Daleks in Manhattan"/"Evolution of the Daleks" (2007) and "The Parting of the Ways" (2005), respectively. Prior to the Prom performance of this music, an introduction by Noel Clarke and Camille Coduri was interrupted by two Daleks (voiced by Nicholas Briggs) and Davros (played by Julian Bleach).
Murray Gold	"Donna" – "The Girl in the Fireplace" – "Astrid"	4:15	This suite combines "Donna's Theme" and music from Doctor Who episode "Journey's End" (2008) written for Tenth Doctor companion Donna Noble, Reinette's theme, "Madame de Pompadour" from "The Girl in the Fireplace" (2006) and Tenth Doctor companion Astrid Peth's theme from "Voyage of the Damned" (2007).
Mark-Anthony Turnage	"The Torino Scale"	4:15	Titled after the Torino Scale, a measuring system used when predicting the likelihood of asteroids hitting Earth, "The Torino Scale" is the first movement of Turnage's Three Asteroids. "The Torino Scale" was premièred in the United Kingdom at the Doctor Who Prom.
Gustav Holst	"The Planets – Jupiter"	7:45	"Jupiter" is the fourth movement of Holst's The Planets suite. It was first heard at the end of the First World War in 1918. During the Prom performance, three performers dressed as Ood entered the hall.
Murray Gold	"This is Gallifrey"	3:30	Also known as "This is Gallifrey: Our Childhood, Our Home", "This is Gallifrey" is Gold's anthem for the Doctor's home planet Gallifrey used throughout Series 3 of Doctor Who (2007).
Murray Gold	"Doomsday"	5:03	Accompanied in this concert by composer Murray Gold on keyboard and a full orchestra and choir, original vocalist Melanie Pappenheim provides the vocals for "Doomsday", which was featured in the Doctor Who episode "Doomsday" (2006) after Rose Tyler was trapped in a parallel universe. Following the performance, presenter Freema Agyeman commented, "Not a dry eye in the house, I should imagine".
Murray Gold	"The Doctor's Theme/Song of Freedom"	5:30	"The Doctor's Theme/Song of Freedom" combines "The Doctor's Theme", a recurring theme in Doctor Who, with the anthem "Song of Freedom" which featured in the Series 4 finale, "Journey's End" (2008) as both Doctors, the Doctor-Donna, Rose, Martha, Captain Jack Harkness, Sarah Jane Smith, Mickey Smith and Jackie Tyler travelled in the TARDIS as it towed Earth back to its rightful place, with help from Torchwood, Luke Smith, Mr Smith and K-9 Mark IV. "Song of Freedom" is derived from "Ood Song" written for earlier Series 4 episode "Planet of the Ood" (2008) as "a moving and triumphant refrain for the newly freed slaves", the Ood. The Royal Albert Hall audience was encouraged to clap along.
Murray Gold	"Song for Ten"	4:10	"Song for Ten" was the first original song written by Gold for Doctor Who and it featured in the first Doctor Who Christmas special, "The Christmas Invasion" (2005). Original vocalist Tim Phillips provided the vocals accompanied by the orchestra and choir; the audience was encouraged to sing along.
Ron Grainer	"Doctor Who Theme"	1:30	"Doctor Who Theme" was composed by Ron Grainer and electronically realised by Delia Derbyshire and the BBC Radiophonic Workshop in 1963. For the return of Doctor Who in 2005, Gold rearranged the theme tune, adding strings, brass and more sounds. In 2007, Gold rearranged the theme tune once more and it was introduced to the series in Christmas special "Voyage of the Damned" (2007), with this version featuring electric guitar and heavier drum sounds. Gold's later arrangement is the one featured in this concert.

== Production ==
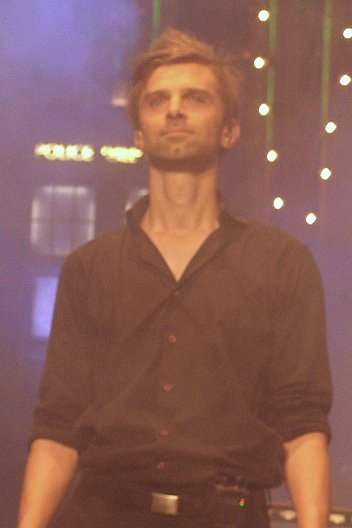
Conductor Ben Foster at the Doctor Who Prom.

The concert was conducted by Ben Foster and Stephen Bell, featuring the BBC Philharmonic and the London Philharmonic Choir, with solo performances by Tim Phillips and Melanie Pappenheim. Foster also arranged Gold's compositions for the performance. Freema Agyeman, who played Martha Jones in the third and fourth series of Doctor Who, presented the programme with guests Noel Clarke and Camille Coduri, who respectively played Mickey Smith and Jackie Tyler in the first, second and fourth series of the television programme. Catherine Tate, who played the Doctor's companion Donna Noble in the 2006 Doctor Who Christmas special and the fourth series of the programme, made a surprise guest appearance to introduce "Donna's Theme", not having been listed as being a presenter in the lineup. Sarah Walker presented BBC Radio 3's coverage of the concert.

The full concert was rehearsed on Saturday, 26 July, the day before the performance. (At the 2006 Children in Need concert in Cardiff, a dress rehearsal had been attempted on the day of the performance, but there was only time to run half of the show.) The staging included the TARDIS prop centre stage, next to the bust of Henry Wood; a wall bearing the graffiti "Bad Wolf" was placed behind the police box and the bust.

The monsters and aliens who appeared on stage and in the audience were played by artists who had portrayed them on television, including Dan Starkey as the Sontaran Commander Skorr (a role he had played in the 2008 episodes "The Sontaran Strategem" and "The Poison Sky"). In the plot of the mini-episode "Music of the Spheres", a space-time portal opened from the interior of the Doctor's TARDIS to the Royal Albert Hall. During the episode, both the alien Graske and the Doctor's musical composition "fell" through the portal. Actor Jimmy Vee appeared on stage as the Graske, and sheets of music manuscript paper dropped onto the orchestra from the flyloft above the stage. Prior to the piece "Davros and the Daleks", a Dalek (operated by Barnaby Edwards, voiced by Nicholas Briggs) appeared on stage, and Davros appeared in the audience, announcing that the Royal Albert Hall would become his new palace, and the audience his "obedient slaves". Julian Bleach, who had played Davros in the 2008 television episodes "The Stolen Earth" and "Journey's End", reprised his role under Davros' heavy makeup for the concert.

== Broadcast ==
The Doctor Who Prom was broadcast live on BBC Radio 3. BBC Radio 3's recording of the concert could be streamed or downloaded via BBC iPlayer for a week after transmission and the concert was recorded for later television showing on BBC One.

During the interval of the concert, BBC Radio 3 broadcast "Let's Do the Time Warp Again", a 25-minute commentary by science fiction writer Justina Robson. In the essay, Robson discussed the moral contradictions of Doctor Who and compared the programme with religious texts as a cultural touchstone.

Highlights of the concert were televised on BBC One and BBC HD on 1 January 2009, and were also made available on digital television via the "Red Button". The television broadcast included "Concert Prologue", "All the Strange, Strange Creatures", "The Doctor Forever", "Rose" and "Martha vs The Master"; the mini-episode "Music of the Spheres" (with audience reactions); "The Daleks and Davros", "Donna"/"The Girl in the Fireplace"/"Astrid", "This is Gallifrey", "Doomsday", "The Doctor's Theme/Song of Freedom" and the "Doctor Who Theme." None of the non-Doctor Who music was included in the highlights broadcast on television. This edition of the concert was released as a bonus feature on the DVD for "The Next Doctor".

Uncut video of the concert was available via the Red Button for a period beginning 11 January 2009, and for a period beginning from 12 January 2009 was available to UK residents on the BBC's Doctor Who website.

== Reception ==
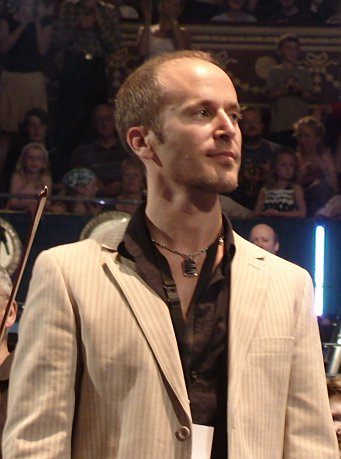
Composer Murray Gold at the concert

Writing in The Times, Caitlin Moran called the event "the hottest ticket in town this week," and added, "As a child's introduction to orchestral recitals, it is peerless." Moran also noted "a moment of squirming shame" at the realisation that composer Murray Gold has not won a BAFTA. Matthew Rye of The Daily Telegraph called the production "fluently staged" and called Gold's music "evocative"; he also described "The Torino Scale" as "a visceral miniature".

Bruce Dessau, writing in the Evening Standard, felt that the classical compositions "jostled for attention" with Gold's work, and called "The Torino Scale" "cacophonous". Of the Doctor Who pieces, Dessau singled out soloist Melanie Pappenheim for her performance of Doomsday describing it as "haunting" and that it "hoisted the emotional level to a peak unsurpassed even when the team saved Earth, accompanied by the soaring Song Of Freedom." Dessau's sole complaint was that the concert gave insufficient attention to the work of the BBC Radiophonic Workshop, and that the programme's conclusion with the Doctor Who theme "felt more like an afterthought than a climax."

In The Guardian, Nicholas Lezard praised the idea behind the concert: "One can imagine no better way to get children interested in classical music than by plonking them down in front of an orchestra belting out music from Doctor Who." Lezard noted that the non-Doctor Who music "was received with baffled tolerance"; he said that the BBC Philharmonic played "Montagues and Capulets" "crisply and excitingly", but felt that "Ride of the Valkyries" "tends to sound a little underpowered unless played by two orchestras at once". Lezard called Gold's work "a little derivative" but "perfectly suited to the task"; however, he complained that Gold's orchestration of the Doctor Who theme "drowned" Delia Derbyshire's original arrangement. He wrote that "the hundred-strong choir and soloist Melanie Pappenheim performed flawlessly," and also praised the technical execution of the complex programme.

In a review of the Doctor Who Series 4 soundtrack, Abigail Sanderson mentioned that although some had objected to the Doctor Who Prom, even "fearsome critics" agreed that it "was an excellent forum for introducing younger listeners to concert music."

Covering the event for Doctor Who Magazine, David Darlington noted that the stated aim of the Proms is "to encourage an audience for concert hall music who, though not normally attending classical concerts, would be attracted by the low ticket prices and informal atmosphere" and concluded that if the children in the audience had such a love for Doctor Who "that they have come all this way to spend an hour or two listening to the music from the show, and that they will happily also sit through a formal, experimental and rather abrasive piece of modern classical music and then enthusiastically applaud at the end, then all concerned can be happy with their day's work."

Michael Beek, who wrote the programme notes for the concert, called it "a very theatrical experience", but suggested that it was "a small shame" that the BBC National Orchestra of Wales, who record the music for the television programme, had not been invited to perform. Beek also said that the performance of "Song for Ten" by original vocalist Tim Phillips "left a lot to be desired".

Reviewing the highlights from the concert shown on television, Paul Byrne of Dublin's Evening Herald called the concert "a delightfully silly idea" with an "irresistible charm". Anna Lowman of TV Scoop noted that some of the power of the featured Doctor Who music came from the audience associating the themes with powerful scenes from the television series. She added, "It was a joy to watch it on the TV, so I can only imagine that it was magical to be there on the night itself."

Writing in The Daily Telegraph, Gillian Reynolds listed the Doctor Who Prom as one of several successful elements in the 2008 Proms season. Jenny Abramsky, the BBC's former Director of Audio and Music, praised Proms director Roger Wright "for creating such a wonderful and exciting event that clearly grabbed children's imagination." Anna Picard, music correspondent for The Independent, included the Doctor Who Prom as a highlight in her year-end review of classical music in 2008. However, by April 2009 a journalist for The Sunday Times said that "there have been complaints that the Proms need no more gimmicks – such as David Tennant hosting a Doctor Who prom for children last year" (although Tennant did not host the Prom).
