= Julian Bleach =

English actor (born 1963)

- Born: 29 December 1963 (age 62); Bournemouth, England
- Education: London Academy of Music and Dramatic Art
- Occupations: Actor, singer, playwright
- Years active: 1990–present

Julian Bleach (born 29 December 1963) is an English actor, singer and playwright, who is known as co-creator and "MC" of Shockheaded Peter, a musical entertainment based on the works of Heinrich Hoffmann, which won the 2002 Olivier Award for Best Entertainment. He is also known for playing Davros in the 2005 revival of Doctor Who (in 2008, 2015, and 2023).

== Early life ==
Bleach was born in Bournemouth. He was educated at Summerbee School and studied drama at Bournemouth and Poole College. After that he trained at London Academy of Music and Dramatic Art.

== Career ==
Bleach's other theatre work includes playing Ariel to Patrick Stewart's Prospero in the RSC's 2007 production of The Tempest, directed by Rupert Goold, and Mr. Sowerberry (to Louise Gold's Mrs. Sowerberry) and Dr. Grimwig in the 2009 Theatre Royal Drury Lane production of the musical Oliver!.

On television, he has starred as "The Monster" in the 2007 ITV adaptation of Frankenstein. He played the Grand Master from the second series of children's drama M.I. High and guest-starred as the villainous "Ghostmaker" in Peter J. Hammond's "From Out of the Rain" in the second series of Doctor Who spin-off series Torchwood. Bleach was later cast by the parent series as Davros, enemy of The Doctor and creator of the Daleks, in "The Stolen Earth" and "Journey's End", the two-part season finale of the 2008 series, and live at the Doctor Who Prom, before returning to the role in the 2015 series opener, "The Magician's Apprentice", and its conclusion, "The Witch's Familiar". In 2010, it was announced that he would star as the eponymous character in The Nightmare Man, the opening story of Series 4 of The Sarah Jane Adventures. This makes him one of only two actors (the other being Paul Marc Davis) to appear in not only Doctor Who, but two of its spin-offs, Torchwood and The Sarah-Jane Adventures. He reappeared in the 2023 Children in Need mini-episode Destination: Skaro, portraying Davros prior to his disfigurement.

In 2011, he appeared as Niccolò Machiavelli in the Showtime series The Borgias. In 2016 Bleach appeared as Barkilphedro in the critically acclaimed new musical The Grinning Man at Bristol Old Vic which transferred in late 2017 to Trafalgar Studios. In the same year he also appeared in Rory Mullarkey's new play Saint George and the Dragon at the Royal National Theatre.

== Filmography ==
=== Film ===
Year	Title	Role	Notes
1990	The Fool		
1994	Beg!	Dr. Rogers	
1999	Topsy-Turvy	Mr. Plank	
2002	Ghost Child	Leo	
2005	The Brothers Grimm	Letorc	
2006	The Fall	Mystic/Elderly Patient	
2008	Lecture 21	Aristocrat	
2009	Badinage	Franklin Gothic	
2011	Anonymous	Sir Richard Pole	
2012	Lord Horror: The Dark and Silver Age	Lord Horror	
2012	Les Misérables	Claquesous	
2013	The Fallen Word	Franklin Gothic	
2015	Avengers: Age of Ultron	Ballet Instructor	
2015	MindGamers	Preacher	
2015	Remainder	Pianist	
2015	Word Made Flesh: Sir Peter Blake	Mad Hatter	Short film
2016	Mother	Crematorium Technician	Short film
2016	Suicide Note	The Man	Short film

=== Television ===
Year	Title	Role	Notes
2002	The Gist	David Luscombe	TV movie
2005	Riot at the Rite	Violinist	TV movie
2007	The Afternoon Play	Stefan	Episode: "Come Fly With Me"
2007	Frankenstein	The Monster	TV movie
2008–13	M.I. High	The Grand Master	
2008	Torchwood	The Ghostmaker	Episode: "From Out of the Rain"
2008, 2015, 2023	Doctor Who	Davros	4 episodes, 1 mini episode
2008	Criminal Justice	Gaoler	Series 1, Episode 3
2009	Doctor Who at the Proms	Davros	
2010	The Sarah Jane Adventures	The Nightmare Man	Serial: The Nightmare Man
2010	Psychoville	Doctor/Eddie	Episode: "Halloween Special"
2011–13	The Borgias	Niccolò Machiavelli	
2012	Ripper Street	Cecil Creighton	Episode: "I Need Light"
2014	This is Jinsy	Undertaker	Episode: "Population 791"
2016	Close to the Enemy	Geoffrey Salter	TV miniseries
2017	Emerald City	Roquat	4 episodes
2019	Heirs of the Night	Dracula	
2022	Halo	Mercy	x episodes
2022	The English	Jerome McClintock	2 episodes

=== Video games ===
Year	Title	Role	Notes
2015	Lego Dimensions	Davros	Uncredited

== Theatre ==
Year	Title	Role	Notes
1992	Macbeth	Macbeth	Everyman Theatre, Cheltenham
1993	Dracula	Count Dracula	London Bubble Theatre Company
1995	Gormenghast	Flay/Barquentine	David Glass New Mime Ensemble
1996	The Government Inspector	Zemlyanika	Leeds Playhouse
1997	A Midsummer Night's Dream	Puck	English Shakespeare Company
1998–05	Shockheaded Peter	Shockheaded Peter	
2002	Cabaret	Emcee	Chichester Festival Theatre
2003	The Firework-Maker's Daughter	Hamlet the Elephant	Crucible Theatre
2005	The Importance of Being Earnest	Lane/Merriman	Oxford Playhouse
2006	Antony and Cleopatra	Clown/Alexas	Royal Shakespeare Company
2006	The Tempest	Ariel	Royal Shakespeare Company
2008–09	Oliver!	Mr. Sowerberry/Dr. Grimwig	Theatre Royal, Drury Lane
2010	Every Good Boy Deserves Favour	Ivanov	Royal National Theatre
2016–18	The Grinning Man	Barkilphedro	Bristol Old Vic/Trafalgar Studios
2016	Raising Martha	Roger Duffy	Park Theatre
2017	Saint George and the Dragon	The Dragon	Royal National Theatre
2022	Into the Woods	The Mysterious Man	Theatre Royal, Bath
2024-25	The Importance of Being Earnest	Merriman/Lane	Royal National Theatre
