= David Gooderson =

English actor

- Born: David Richard Gooderson; 24 February 1941 (age 85); Lahore, British India (now Pakistan) British
- Occupation: Actor
- Known for: Playing Davros in Doctor Who (1979)

David Richard Gooderson (born 24 February 1941) is an Indian-born British actor and writer who has appeared in several television roles.

== Career ==
As well as portraying Davros, creator of the Daleks in the Doctor Who serial Destiny of the Daleks, he appeared in episodes of Lovejoy, Mapp & Lucia and A Touch of Frost. Gooderson was also featured on many radio programmes for the BBC, including The Next Programme Follows Almost Immediately with Bill Wallis, David Jason, Denise Coffey and Jonathan Cecil and Huddwinks with Roy Hudd and others. He wrote several plays for stage and radio broadcast, and published several books about Kenneth Grahame.

Gooderson was a member of the Cambridge Footlights, and featured in the cast of the 1964 Footlights revue, Stuff What Dreams Are Made Of.

== Filmography ==
=== Film ===
Year	Title	Role	Notes
1996	Tiré à part	Bouquiniste	
2006	The Dalek Tapes	Davros	

=== Television ===
Year	Title	Role	Notes
1969	The Plane Makers	Armaton	Episode: "Cat Is You, Bird Is Me"
1969	The Mind of Mr. J.G. Reeder	Sidney Telfer	Episode: "The Stealer of Marble"
1970	The Adventures of Don Quick	1st Bank Clerk	Episode: "People Isn't Everything"
1976	Happy Ever After	Mr. Lawton	Episode: "Restoration Piece"
1978	Hazell	Shop Assistant	Episode: "Hazell Meets the First Eleven"
1978	Play of the Week	First reporter	Episode: "Fairies"
1979	Doctor Who	Davros	3 episodes
1981	Bognor	Andy	2 episodes
1981	Something in Disguise	Doctor	Episode: "Jamaica"
1981	Tenko	Major Sims	Episode: "Shattered Dreams"
1981	Codename Icarus	Maths Teacher	2 episodes
1983–1985	Seaview	Mr. Shelton	12 episodes
1984–1995	The Bill	Various roles	3 episodes
1985	Mapp & Lucia	Mr. Woolgar	5 episodes
1986	Bluebell	Walker	Episode #1.5
1987	Relative Strangers	Spencer	Episode #2.7
1987	C.A.T.S. Eyes	Evans	Episode: "Carrier Pigeon"
1987	Sunday Premiere	Lecturer	Episode: "Claws"
1988	Hannay	Ship's Steward	Episode: "The Fellowship of the Black Stone"
1988	Bergerac	Sidney Le Blanc	Episode: "Burnt"
1989	The Paradise Club	Jack Pringle	2 episodes
1990	Perfect Scoundrels	Priest	Episode: "Bad Penny Blues"
1990	London's Burning	Funeral Director	Episode #3.8
1991	Lovejoy	Cyril Catchpole	Episode: "Riding in Rollers (1 of 2)"
1991	Murder Most Horrid	First Patient	1 episode
1992	True Crimes	—N/a	Episode: "Knightsbridge Safe Deposit"
1992	Boon	Bank Manager	Episode: "Walkout"
1992	Rumpole of the Bailey	Denver	Episode: "Rumpole and the Miscarriage of Justice"
1992	Second Thoughts	Hotel Manager	Episode: "Double Booked"
1992–2006	A Touch of Frost	Derek Simpkins	18 episodes
1994	Murder Most Horrid	Bert	1 episode
1995	Johnny and the Dead	Councillor	2 episodes
1995	Searching	Mr. Gillespie	2 episodes
2003	Footballers' Wives	Minister	Episode: "Go for the Overkill"
2004	Casualty	Alistair Roberts	Episode: "Where There's Life..."
2007	Talk to Me	Punter	Episode: "The Wedding"
2007	Doctors	Stan Holloway	1 episode
2008	Doctor Who Confidential	Davros	Episode: "Friends and Foe"
2014	Mr. Sloane	Mr. Pitman	Episode: "It's a Date, Mr. Sloane"
2015	Cuffs	Lewis Gardener	Episode: "Shakedowns and Stakeouts"
2020	Doctors	Albert Pie	1 episode

== Writer ==
Gooderson has also written several books, including a few plays such as The Killing of Mr. Toad and So Great a Crime, based on the true story of Major-General Hector MacDonald.
