= Fourteenth Doctor =

Fictional character from Doctor Who

The Doctor
The Fourteenth Doctor
- Doctor Who character
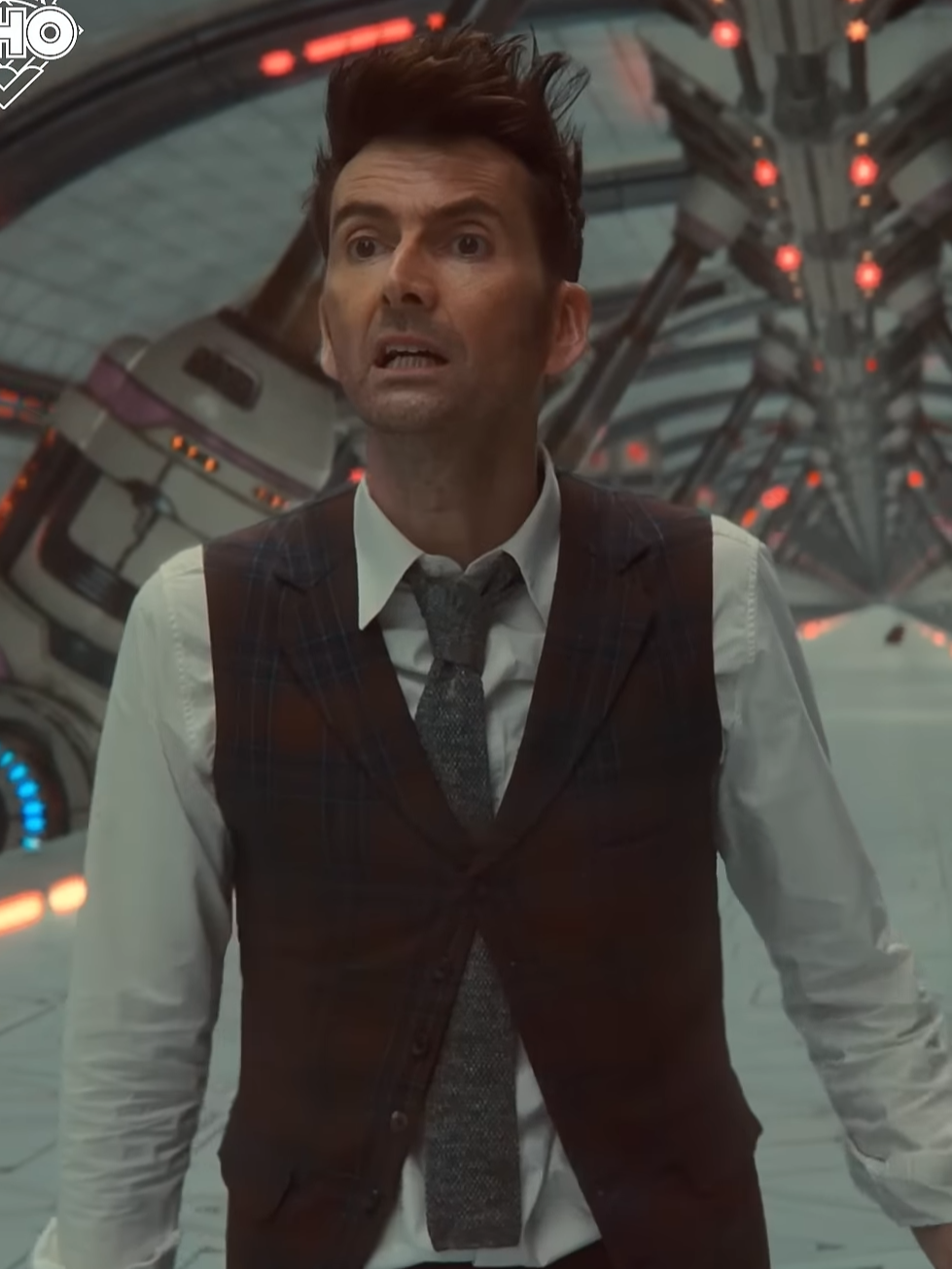
- David Tennant as the Fourteenth Doctor in "Wild Blue Yonder" (2023)
- First regular appearance: "The Star Beast" (2023)
- Last regular appearance: "The Giggle" (2023)
- Introduced by: Russell T Davies
- Portrayed by: David Tennant
- Preceded by: Jodie Whittaker (Thirteenth Doctor)
- Succeeded by: Ncuti Gatwa (Fifteenth Doctor)

Information
- Tenure: 25 November – 9 December 2023
- Appearances: 3 stories (3 episodes)
- Companions: Donna Noble
- Chronology: Specials (2023)

The Fourteenth Doctor is an incarnation of the Doctor and the protagonist of the British science fiction television series Doctor Who for the 2023 specials. He is portrayed by Scottish actor David Tennant, who previously portrayed the Tenth Doctor from 2005 to 2010 and again in 2013.

Within the series narrative, the Doctor is a millennia-old alien Time Lord from the planet Gallifrey, with somewhat unknown origins, who travels in time and space in the TARDIS, frequently with companions. At the end of each incarnation's life, the Doctor regenerates, changing their physical appearance and aspects of their personality. Tennant's second incarnation is outwardly similar to the Tenth Doctor, but with a more sentimental and affectionate persona, and a weariness that reflects his life experiences in the centuries since.

Prior to the reveal of Tennant's Fourteenth Doctor, the BBC had announced that the Thirteenth Doctor, portrayed by Jodie Whittaker, would be succeeded as the programme's lead by a new Doctor portrayed by Ncuti Gatwa. However, Whittaker's final appearance surprised audiences when she instead regenerated into a form portrayed by Tennant. The BBC later clarified that Gatwa would actually be portraying the Fifteenth Doctor, following on from three special episodes in which David Tennant would play the Fourteenth Doctor.

The Fourteenth Doctor's run consisted of three special episodes as part of the BBC's commemoration of Doctor Who's 60th anniversary, led by returning executive producer Russell T Davies, who previously led the show between 2005 and 2010 and was responsible for managing Tennant's first run as the Tenth Doctor. Tennant was praised for his performance, though some criticised the move to bring back an actor who had previously portrayed the Doctor.

== Appearances ==
Doctor Who is a long-running British science-fiction television series that began in 1963. Its main protagonist, The Doctor, is an alien who travels through time and space in a ship known as the TARDIS along with their travelling companions. When the Doctor dies, they undergo a process known as regeneration, completely changing their appearance and personality. Throughout their travels, the Doctor often comes into conflict with various alien species and antagonists.

The Fourteenth Doctor first appears at the conclusion of "The Power of the Doctor" (2022) immediately following the Thirteenth Doctor's regeneration. The Doctor notices that his appearance has reverted to a form similar to that of the Tenth Doctor (played by David Tennant). The following month, Doctor Who Magazine announced that their monthly comic strip would feature the Fourteenth Doctor in Liberation of the Daleks, a story that picks up straight after the ending of "The Power of the Doctor", depicting roughly the first hour of the Fourteenth Doctor's life. Liberation of the Daleks leads directly into the Fourteenth Doctor's next televised appearance – a minisode aired during the Children in Need telethon on 17 November 2023, informally titled "Destination: Skaro". A short comic strip titled "Under Control", published as part of Doctor Who: The Official Annual 2024, depicted the Fourteenth Doctor shortly after regeneration confronting the Sycorax, a recurring alien species in the series. On 24 November 2023, Tennant appeared in character as the Fourteenth Doctor for the CBeebies Bedtime Story.

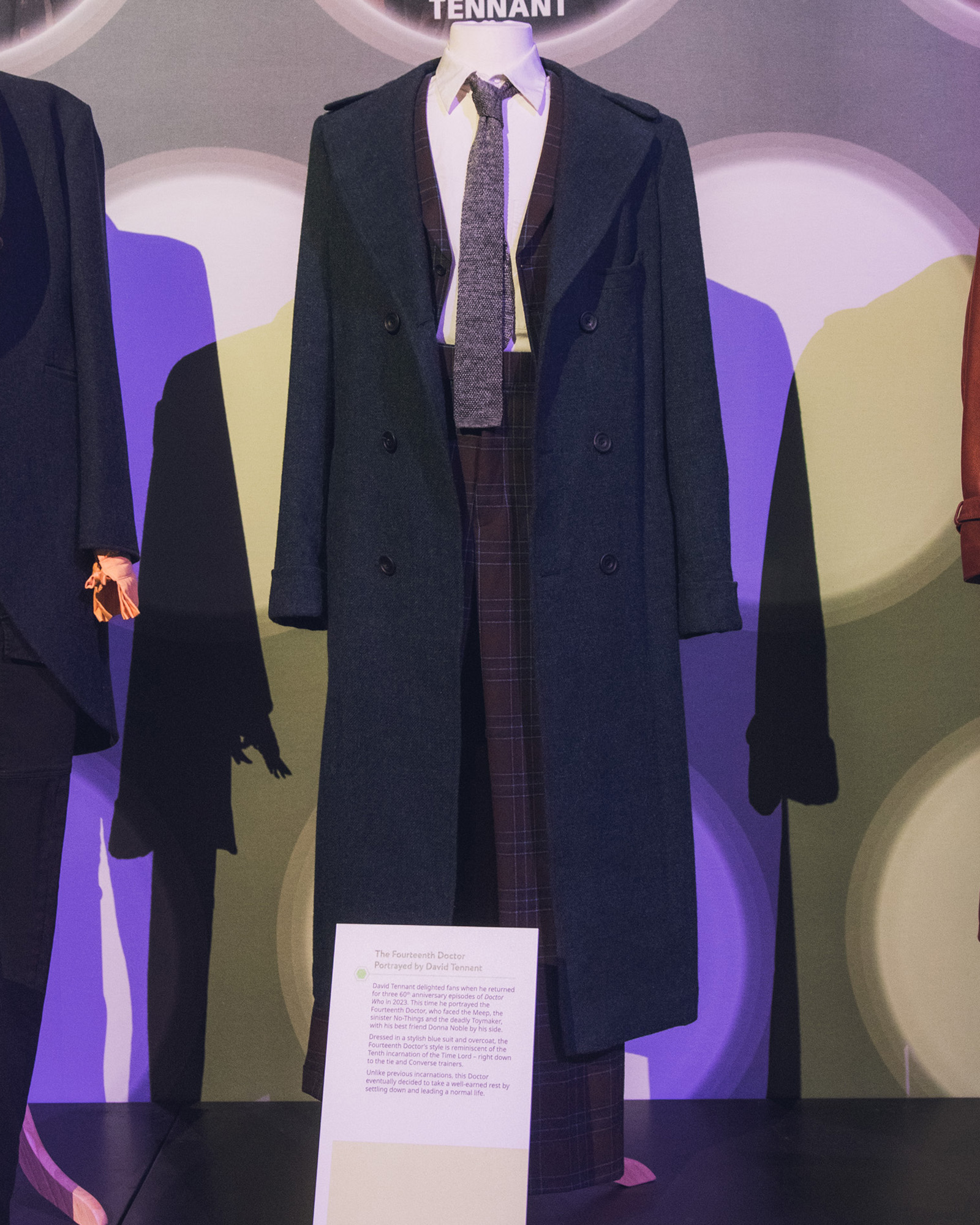
The Fourteenth Doctor's costume

As part of Doctor Who's 60th anniversary specials, the Fourteenth Doctor next appears in "The Star Beast". Arriving in Camden Town, the Doctor bumps into former companion Donna Noble (Catherine Tate) – who had her memory of the Doctor wiped following a Time Lord biological metacrisis by him in his similar-looking tenth incarnation – and her daughter Rose (Yasmin Finney). Encountering the alien Meep who plans on destroying London, the Doctor is forced to trigger the metacrisis, granting Donna access to the knowledge that will enable them to save the city. Donna seems to perish until it is revealed that Rose has inherited some of her mother's repressed Time Lord abilities, allowing the DoctorDonna's powers to be shared safely between the two. Later, Donna spills coffee on the TARDIS console, forcing it into an uncontrolled dematerialisation. The TARDIS crash lands aboard a spaceship that is adrift at the farthest edge of the universe, where they encounter shape-shifting entities known as "Not-Things". When they return to Camden, a few days after their departure, they discover Wilf (Bernard Cribbins) has been keeping watch for the TARDIS, who warns them that the world is coming to an end. The Doctor and Donna team up with UNIT, where the Doctor is reunited with several allies from past adventures to combat a plot by the Toymaker (Neil Patrick Harris) to create global anarchy. In the ensuing battle, the Fourteenth Doctor is shot by the Toymaker, but instead of regenerating, the Doctor "bi-generates" – a supposedly mythical Time Lord process where the new incarnation splits off as a separate physical entity. The Fourteenth Doctor teams up with the new Fifteenth Doctor (Ncuti Gatwa) to defeat the Toymaker. The Fifteenth Doctor warns his predecessor that he's worn himself out and needs to process the psychological impact of recent events. The Fourteenth Doctor settles down with Donna and her family, while the Fifteenth Doctor goes off in a duplicate version of the TARDIS to embark on new adventures.

David Tennant appeared in costume as the Fourteenth Doctor in Comic Relief's Red Nose Day special for 2023, in which co-host Lenny Henry regenerates into him and rushes off to host the show. A costume based on the Fourteenth Doctor's was also added to the video game Fall Guys as part of a promotion for the 60th anniversary specials.

== Development and casting ==
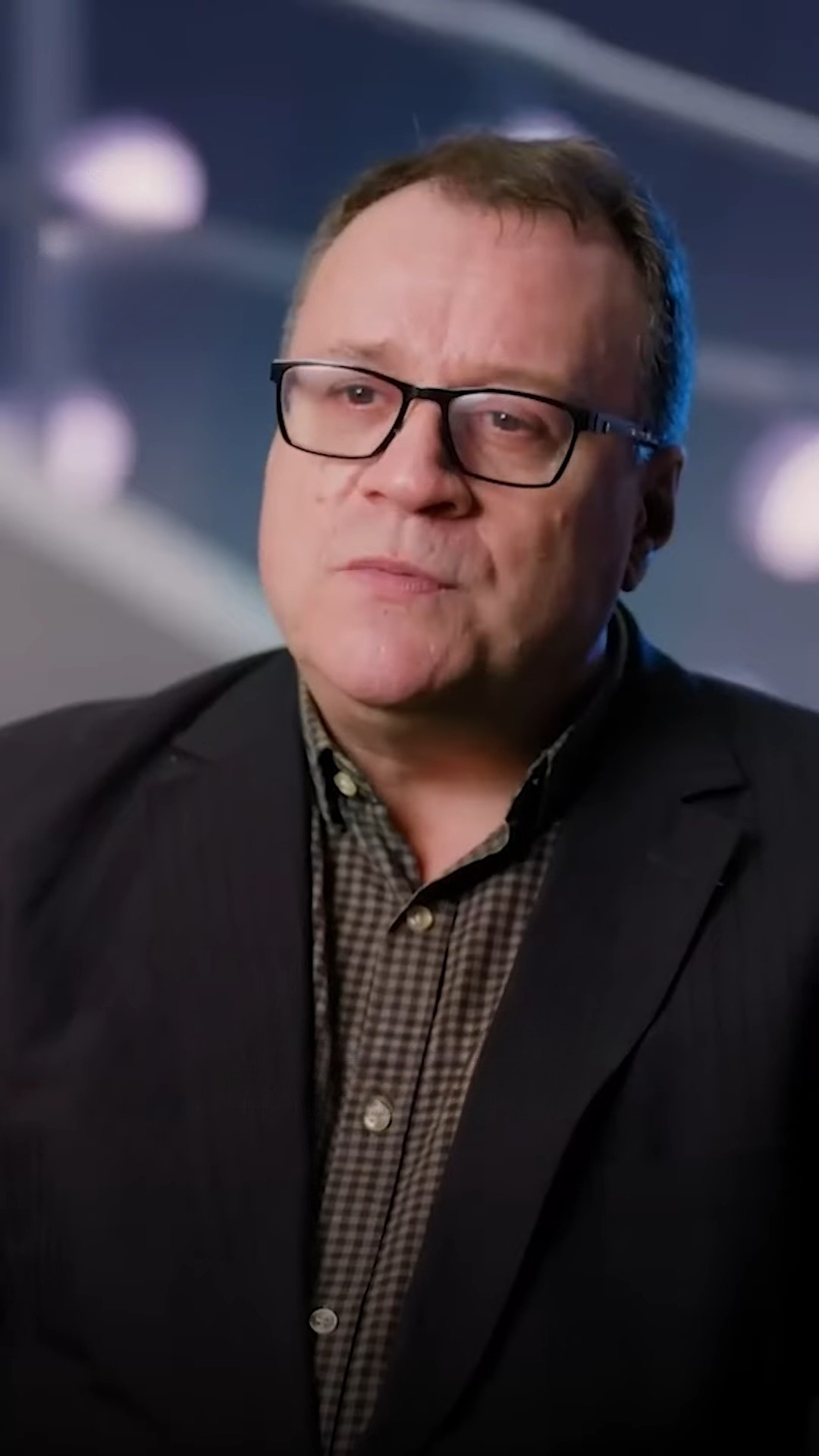
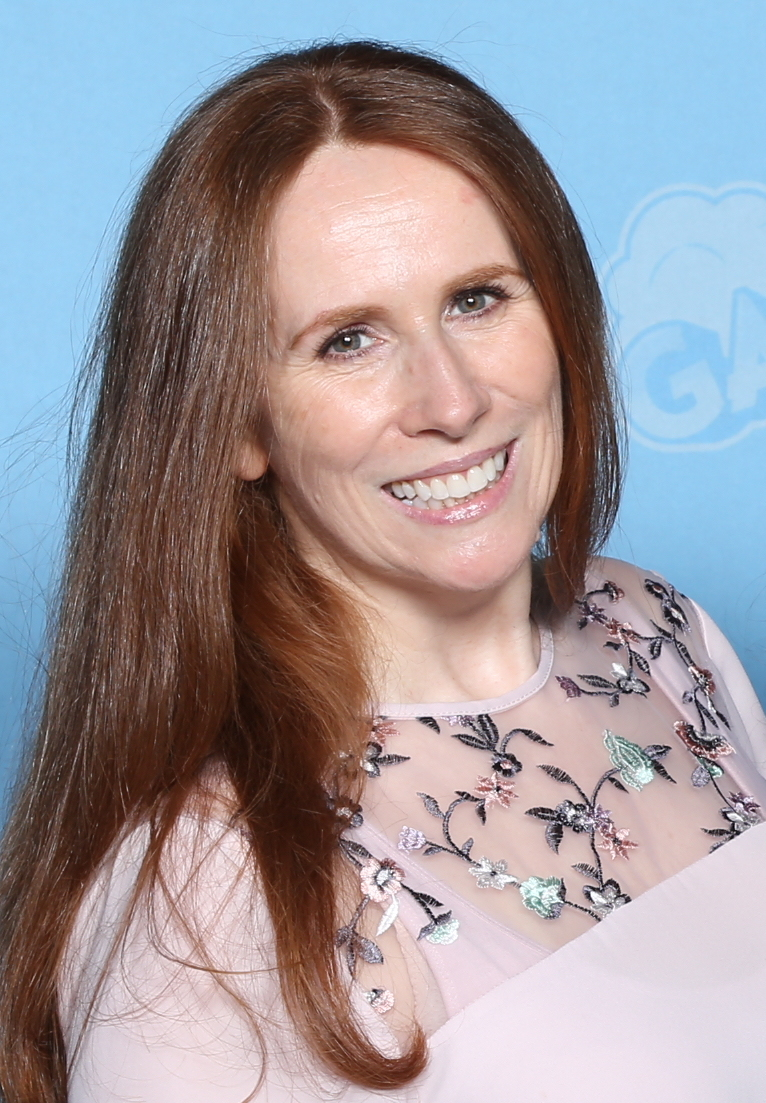
Tennant's return was conceived by showrunner Russell T Davies (left) after a conversation with him and co-star Catherine Tate (right).

Tennant, Tate, and showrunner Russell T Davies participated in the "Doctor Who: Lockdown" events, which were watchalongs of various episodes of the show held by the Doctor Who community during the COVID-19 pandemic, with informal discussion between the three as a result of "Lockdown" leading to the 60th anniversary specials and the reprisals of Tennant and Tate's roles. Davies initially teased their return by not disclosing the true nature of it, hinting that Tennant and Tate may have been reprising their roles via flashbacks or via an alternate universe. Davies originally planned to bring back Tennant as the Tenth Doctor, and not as a separate incarnation, with the 60th anniversary specials instead being flashbacks to unseen Tenth Doctor adventures.

Several actors and actresses were heavily rumoured to be taking over from Whittaker, including Hugh Grant, Michael Sheen, Kris Marshall, Richard Ayoade, Michaela Coel, Kelly Macdonald, and Lenny Henry. Davies's return also led to speculation that an actor he had previously worked with in other projects would join him as the Fourteenth Doctor, with Olly Alexander, Lydia West, Omari Douglas, T'Nia Miller and Fisayo Akinade ranking highly in bookies' odds. Rumours also circulated that David Tennant would reprise his role, having previously portrayed the Tenth Doctor during Davies' time as showrunner, or that Jo Martin, who debuted as the Fugitive Doctor during Whittaker's tenure, would be revealed as the Fourteenth incarnation.

In May 2022, Ncuti Gatwa was announced as the actor who would take over from Jodie Whittaker in the role following a series of special episodes throughout 2022. At the end of the final special, "The Power of the Doctor", it was revealed following Whittaker's regeneration that the Doctor had regenerated into an incarnation portrayed by Tennant, with Gatwa being the fifteenth incarnation of the character. Tennant starred in the programme as the Tenth Doctor from 2005 to 2010 and is the first actor to portray two incarnations of the character over several episodes. The return of an actor as a new incarnation of the Doctor was proposed by Doctor Who co-creator Sydney Newman in a 1986 exchange with then-BBC One controller Michael Grade after the dismissal of Sixth Doctor actor Colin Baker; Newman envisaged Patrick Troughton, who portrayed the Second Doctor, returning for one series before regenerating into a female incarnation. Tom Baker, who played the Fourth Doctor, had returned in the 2013 special "The Day of the Doctor" as a character known as the Curator, suggested to be a possible incarnation of the Doctor.

Davies stated in an interview that despite the Tenth and Fourteenth Doctors' similarities, the Fourteenth was more "human" than the Tenth. The Fourteenth tends to say things the Tenth would not have said, once saying that he loved his companions. In an interview with BBC News following the announcement of his role reprisal, Tennant commented on his Doctor's appearance, saying: "To a sort of casual viewer, I look like I'm sort of dressed in the same way as I used to be. But actually we've gone for something that's sort of the same, but different. That has echoes of the past, but it's also a bit something of the now as well." The Fourteenth Doctor's clothes regenerated with his appearance from the Thirteenth Doctor's, rather than him choosing them like in most of his regenerations. Davies explained that he wished for the Doctor's clothes to change as part of the first regeneration from a female to a male Doctor, fearing it would be interpreted as a mockery of feminine traits and drag culture by having Tennant appearing in clothing designed for Whittaker.

Tennant and Tate appeared as the Fourteenth Doctor and Donna Noble in three specials to commemorate the programme's 60th anniversary in November 2023. Following the specials and the character's in-universe "bi-generation" into the Fifteenth Doctor, Davies stated that there were no further plans to bring Tennant's Fourteenth Doctor back and that the character was "parked". A reference to the Fourteenth Doctor was made in the episode "The Legend of Ruby Sunday" (2024).

== Reception ==
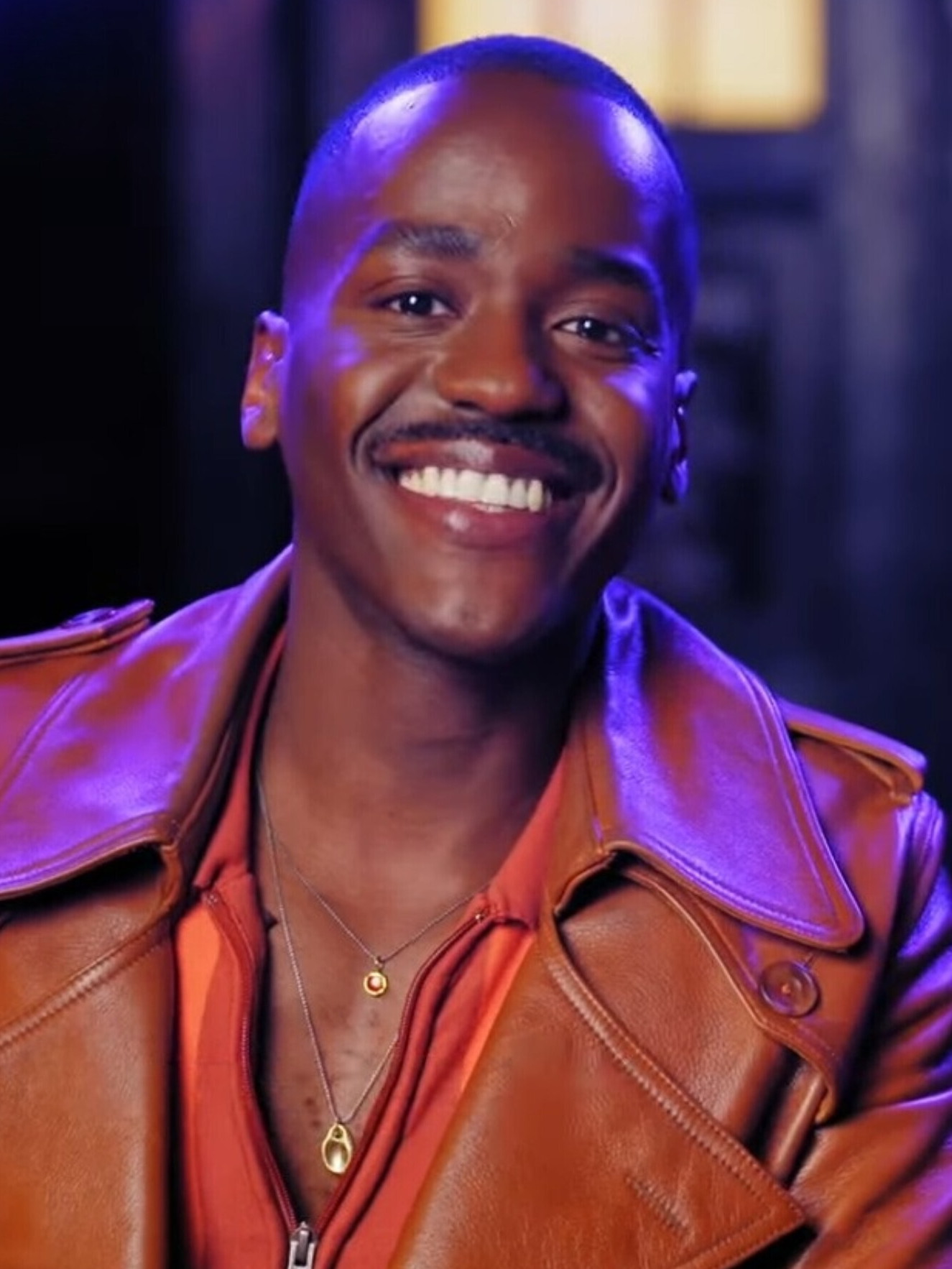
Tennant's return was criticised by some reviewers as overshadowing Ncuti Gatwa's incoming performance.

The unexpected return of Tennant was praised by some, though others criticised the move to bring back an actor who had previously portrayed the Doctor; Diane Darcy felt Tennant's comeback to be preemptive damage control by Davies to ward off any potential criticisms of Ncuti Gatwa's incoming performance. Elisa Guimarães of Collider saw the return of Tennant to the series as a "cop-out", noting how bringing back Tennant after Whittaker's run as the Doctor and before Gatwa's made it seem to casual audiences as though there was little confidence in either's ability to make the show successful. She believed Tennant's return overshadowed both of them and was a "major step back" for the series.

Tennant's portrayal as the Fourteenth Doctor received widespread praise, though there was some mixed feelings towards the concept of bi-generation. Alex Donaldson of VG247 praised Tennant's performance, stating that while he initially had doubts about the incarnation, Tennant's performance helped to encapsulate and showcase the Doctor's growth since the Tenth Doctor, as well as highlighting Tennant's own personal strengths as the Doctor. Rachel Leishman of The Mary Sue noted that despite the feeling of a "cop-out" with Tennant's return, the ability of Tennant's Doctor to come back and expand on the emotions the Tenth Doctor left behind "feels right for what this Doctor is". Vicky Jessop of the London Evening Standard additionally praised the return of Tennant's Doctor, noting that it helped draw back fans of the series from Tennant's initial time on the show while being able to become its own separate identity from the Tenth Doctor.

Constance Grady, writing for Vox, criticised the character's bi-generation, which allowed the Fourteenth Doctor to live on in-universe. She criticised it for apparent bias towards Tennant's incarnation of the Doctor by allowing him to continue to exist while other incarnations died and changed, stating that "Tennant gets treated as though he is somehow more the Doctor than any other incarnation". Charles Pulliam-Moore of The Verge additionally noted that while there were avenues for Tennant's Doctor to explore independently of Gatwa, he felt that Tennant being kept around existed only to placate those uncomfortable with the idea of a black Doctor, noting that "The Giggle" framed the Fifteenth Doctor as emotional support for the Fourteenth Doctor and intrinsically tied to his predecessor, resulting in Gatwa's Doctor having less individuality overall.
