= Terry Molloy =

English actor (born 1947)

- Molloy, with an original Davros mask, at a Doctor Who in-store signing event on 1 December 2007
- Born: 4 January 1947 (age 79); North Shields, Tyne and Wear, England
- Occupation: Actor
- Years active: 1973–present
- Known for: Davros in Doctor Who
- Spouses: Heather Barrett (m. 1970, ?); Victoria Smilie (m. 2005)
- Children: 3
- Website: http://www.terrymolloy.co.uk

Terry Molloy (born 4 January 1947) is an English actor. He is best known for his work on radio and television, especially his portrayal of Mike Tucker in The Archers and Davros in three Doctor Who serials in the 1980s, a role he reprised for audio adventures.

== Early life ==
Molloy was born in 1947 to a Tyneside theatrical family. His father was a Wing Commander in the Royal Air Force. He attended boarding school from the age of five. In the 1960s, he played baritone saxophone in a soul band, The T-Bunkum Band, and appeared at the Cavern Club in Liverpool.

== Career ==
Molloy has been a member of the cast of BBC Radio 4's The Archers playing Mike Tucker since 1974 and has won awards for his work as an actor on radio. In 1980 he performed in the Radio 4 adaptation of Nicholas Monsarrat's war novel The Cruel Sea.

On television, Molloy is known for becoming the third actor to play the mad scientist Davros, the creator of the Daleks, in the long-running science fiction series Doctor Who. He appeared in the stories Resurrection of the Daleks (1984), Revelation of the Daleks (1985) and Remembrance of the Daleks (1988), becoming the first actor to play the role in different stories. Molloy was initially cast in the role by director Matthew Robinson, who had worked with him before and thought his talent for voices would be ideal to recreate the part first played by Michael Wisher. Molloy also appeared in the Doctor Who story Attack of the Cybermen (1985) as an undercover policeman named Russell, again cast by Robinson.

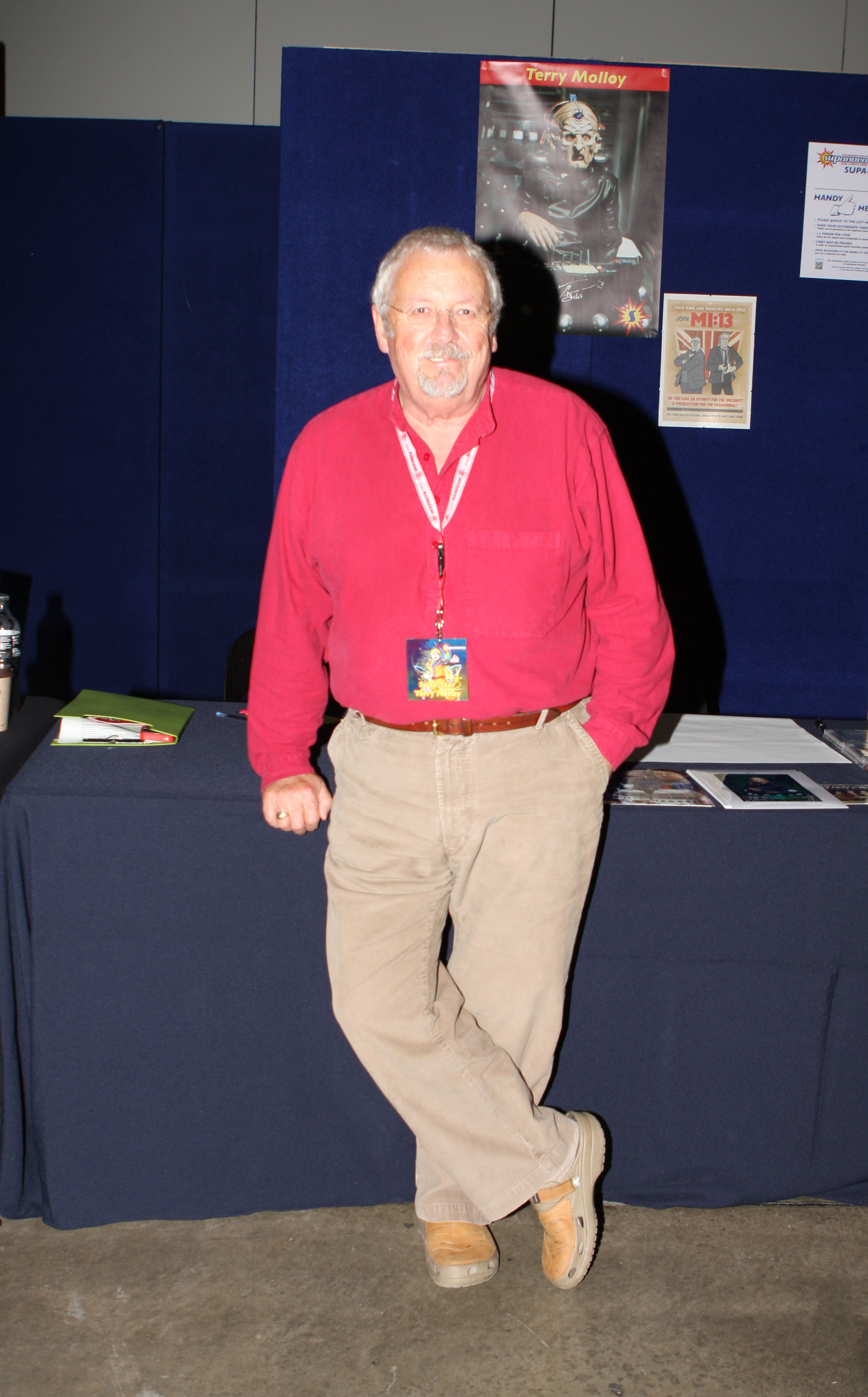
Molloy in 2014

Molloy reprised the role of Davros in the Big Finish Productions audio dramas Davros, The Juggernauts, Terror Firma, Masters of War, The Davros Mission, The Curse of Davros, the four-part miniseries I, Davros, and several episodes of the audio drama series The Eighth Doctor: The Time War. He also played Davros in a 2005 stage production, The Trial of Davros. Molloy also took over the role of Stan Harvey in the ITV soap opera Crossroads from Edward Clayton when Stan made a brief visit to the motel in 1987.

Molloy regularly attends Doctor Who conventions and events, where he meets fans and speaks about his time on the programme. He has also appeared on BBC 7 (now Radio4extra) in the role of Professor Edward Dunning opposite fellow Doctor Who actor Nicholas Courtney in The Scarifyers audio series, co-written by Paul Morris and Simon Barnard for Cosmic Hobo Productions. Molloy also recorded a short cameo, as Davros for the live Doctor Who podcast stage show, 50 Years of Doctor Who: Preachrs Podcast Live 2. He appeared in this alongside a mix of modern and classic Doctor Who actors including; Nicholas Briggs, Richard Franklin, Simon Fisher Becker and Peter Davison.

Molloy's other TV credits include God's Wonderful Railway, Oliver Twist, The Real Eddy English, Tales of Sherwood Forest, Chalkface, The Bill, Casualty, and The Cleaner.

In March 2009, he appeared as 'Eric Clapton' on Harry Hill's TV Burp, a reference to his guest role on Casualty a week earlier, after Hill noted his likeness to the singer.

== Personal life ==
In 1970, Molloy married Heather Barrett. They had three children: daughter Hannah and sons Robert and Philip. He is now married to Victoria Smillie, whom he married in 2005.

Molloy lives in Bawburgh, near Norwich.

== Filmography ==
=== Film ===
Year	Title	Role	Notes
1986	Impure Thoughts	Footballer	
1990	Truly, Madly, Deeply	Immigration officer	
1994	Chasing the Deer	Garvie	
1999	The Promise	The Bass	
2011	In Love with Alma Cogan	Barry Bates	
2012	A Christmas to Remember	Santa	
2015	Draw on Sweet Night	Sir Robert Jermyn	
2016	The Thicket	Ranger Yates	
2016	Lost	Captain Halvosen	
2016	ChickLit	Film Director	
2016	All Your Base: Last of Last	Cats	Voice
2019	Homeless Ashes	Karl Quinn	
2019	Passport to Oblivion	Dr. Simmias	
