= Peter Miles (English actor) =

English actor (1928–2018)

- Miles as Nyder in Doctor Who: Genesis of the Daleks
- Born: Peter Miles-Johnson; 29 August 1928; Ealing, London, England
- Died: 26 February 2018 (aged 89)
- Occupations: Actor, jazz musician
- Known for: Stage and television actor
- Notable work: Doctor Who and the Silurians (1970), Invasion of the Dinosaurs (1974), Genesis of the Daleks (1975)

Peter Miles (29 August 1928 – 26 February 2018) was an English actor. He played many television roles including several different characters in Z-Cars and Doctor Who. His other television work included Blake's 7, Survivors, The Sweeney, Dixon of Dock Green, Moonbase 3, Poldark and Bergerac. His film credits include roles in Made (1972), The Whistle Blower (1986) and Little Dorrit (1988).

Miles was also an accomplished jazz and soul singer. He was a childhood friend of the singer Dusty Springfield, and the first recording Springfield ever made was with Miles on guitar.

== Early life ==
Peter Miles was born Peter Miles-Johnson on 29 August 1928 in Ealing, London. His English father was Edward Hezekiah Miles-Johnson and his French mother was Jacqueline Lesourd. The family lived at Bradley Gardens in West Ealing. His parents divorced when he was in his early teens.

In his teens, Miles was a close friend of Dusty Springfield, who lived nearby in Kent Gardens, West Ealing. They enjoyed singing together along with her brother, Tom.

== Acting career ==
Miles trained initially as a teacher, although he sometimes participated in amateur dramatics. In his late 20s he worked as a teacher at the William Ellis School in Hampstead. Whilst working there, the actress Helen Burns (mother of one of his pupils, future actor Chris Langham) inspired Miles to audition for the Birmingham Repertory Company.

As his acting career grew, Miles had many stage appearances in the 1960s and 1970s, including his favourite role as Satan in J.B., and an appearance in the Shakespeare adaptation An Age of Kings with Eileen Atkins. In the early 1980s he played a season at the RSC opposite Kenneth Branagh in Henry V, Roger Rees in Hamlet and Antony Sher in Richard III.

=== Television work ===
Miles had a broad television career and his appearances included guest parts in Sherlock Holmes (1968), Doomwatch (1970), Colditz (1972), Crown Court (1973), Moonbase 3 (1973), The Sweeney (1975), Survivors (1975) and Bergerac (1990).

In the science fiction series Blake's 7 Miles played the character of Secretary Rontane in the episodes "Seek-Locate-Destroy" (1978) and "Trial" (1979). In Doctor Who, he appeared in three serials, as Dr. Lawrence in Doctor Who and the Silurians (1970), Professor Whitaker in Invasion of the Dinosaurs (1974) and Nyder in Genesis of the Daleks (1975). Miles also played Sheikh Hamad in The Sandbaggers in 1978.

=== Film work ===
Miles appeared in the Henry VIII feature film Monarch alongside Doctor Who actors T. P. McKenna and Jean Marsh.

=== Radio and other work ===
Miles also performed in the BBC Radio 5 Doctor Who audio drama The Paradise of Death in 1993, playing the villain Tragan. Miles contributed to several other Doctor Who spinoffs, including the independent video production More Than a Messiah and the audio dramas Zygons: Absolution and Prosperity Island, all produced by BBV. For the licensed audio drama producers Big Finish Productions, he appeared in Whispers of Terror in 1999 and Sarah Jane Smith: Mirror, Signal, Manoeuvre in 2002. He has reprised his role as Nyder three times; in the 1993 and 2005 productions of the stage play The Trial of Davros, and in the 2006 Big Finish audio drama I, Davros: Guilt. For Magic Bullet Productions, he appeared in five of the Kaldor City SF audio dramas, in the role of scheming politician Landerchild. He has also appeared in the second volume of The True History of Faction Paradox, The Ship of a Billion Years, as the Egyptian deity Anhur. He played Lord Straxus in the Bernice Summerfield Season 9 episode "The Adventure of the Diogenes Damsel". He also appeared in Lovejoy in the episode "Pig in a Poke".

=== Music ===
Miles was a jazz singer and guitarist. He appeared in a duet with his childhood friend Dusty Springfield in her 1967 recording of "Can't We Be Friends?". Miles continued to perform in music clubs in later life.

== Death ==
Miles died on 27 February 2018 at the age of 89. His death was discovered when he failed to turn up for his regular performance spot at his local music venue. His death was publicly announced the following week via Twitter.

== Filmography ==
Year	Title	Role	Notes
1972	Made	Doctor	
1976	The Eagle Has Landed	Adolf Hitler	Uncredited
1978	L'amour en question		
1986	The Whistle Blower	Stephen Kedge	
1987	Little Dorrit	Mr. Dubbin	
1987	Intimate Contact	Returning officer	TV Series
1993	The Punk	Shakespeare	
2000	Monarch		
2001	Possessions	Robin Scoops	
