= Science fiction theatre =

Type of drama

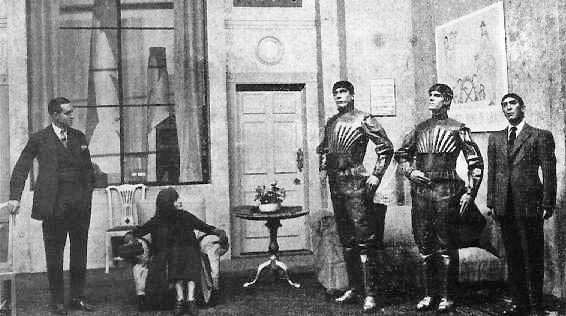
Scene from a production of Rosumovi Univerzální Roboti (Rossum's Universal Robots) by Karel Čapek. The play introduced the term "robot" to the world

Science fiction theatre includes live dramatic works, but generally not cinema or television programmes. It has long been overshadowed by its literary and broadcast counterparts, but has an extensive history, and via the play R.U.R. introduced the word robot into global usage.

== Background ==
Ralph Willingham in his 1993 study Science Fiction and the Theatre catalogued 328 plays with sf elements, several of which were adaptations. Christos Callow Jr created the Internet Science Fiction Theatre Database in 2018 including mainly 21st century plays that feature elements of science fiction, fantasy and horror. In addition to productions of individual plays, the science fiction theatre festival Sci-Fest LA was launched in Los Angeles in 2014, and the festivals of Otherworld and Talos: Science Fiction Theatre Festival of London were both launched in 2015 in Chicago and in London, UK respectively.

Posle milijon godina (After Million of Years), written by Dragutin Ilić in 1889, is considered the first science fiction theatrical play in the history of the world literature.

== Chronological selection of science fiction plays ==
- Presumption; or, the Fate of Frankenstein adapted from Mary Shelley's novel of the same name by Richard Brinsley Peake, 1823
- Journey Through the Impossible by Jules Verne and Adolphe d'Ennery, 1882
- Dr. Jekyll and Mr. Hyde adapted from Robert Louis Stevenson's novella The Strange Case of Dr Jekyll and Mr Hyde by Thomas Russell Sullivan, 1887
- Dr. Jekyll and Mr. Hyde an unauthorised adaptation of Robert Louis Stevenson's novella The Strange Case of Dr Jekyll and Mr Hyde by John McKinney, 1888
- Dr. Jekyll and Mr. Hyde, Or a Mis-Spent Life adapted from Robert Louis Stevenson's novella The Strange Case of Dr Jekyll and Mr Hyde by Luella Forepaugh and George F. Fish, 1897
- R.U.R. by Karel Čapek, 1920
- The Blue Flame by George V. Hobart and John Willard, 1920
- Back to Methuselah by George Bernard Shaw, 1922
- The Makropulos Affair by Karel Čapek, 1922
- The Bedbug by Vladimir Mayakovsky, 1929
- The Bathhouse by Vladimir Mayakovsky, 1930
- Night of the Auk by Arch Oboler, 1956
- Rhinoceros by Eugène Ionesco, 1959
- The Bedsitting Room by Spike Milligan and John Antrobus, 1962
- The Curse of the Daleks by David Whitaker and Terry Nation, 1965
- Doctor Who and the Daleks in the Seven Keys to Doomsday by Terrence Dicks, 1974
- Starstruck by Elaine Lee, 1980
- Henceforward... by Alan Ayckbourn, 1987
- A Clockwork Orange: A Play with Music by Anthony Burgess adapted from his novel of the same name, 1987
- Greenland by Howard Brenton, 1988
- Doctor Who – The Ultimate Adventure by Terrence Dicks, 1989
- They're Made Out of Meat by Terry Bisson, 1991 short story later adapted by author as a play
- Communicating Doors by Alan Ayckbourn, 1994
- Comic Potential by Alan Ayckbourn, 1998
- Whenever by Alan Ayckbourn, 2000
- Far Away by Caryl Churchill, 2000
- A Number by Caryl Churchill, 2004
- My Sister Sadie by Alan Ayckbourn, 2003
- The Cut by Mark Ravenhill, 2004
- Mercury Fur by Philip Ridley, 2005
- Klingon Christmas Carol by Christopher Kidder-Mostrom and Sasha Warren, 2007
- Really Old, Like Forty Five by Tamsin Oglesby, 2010
- A Thousand Stars Explode in the Sky by David Eldridge, Robert Holman and Simon Stephens, 2010
- Earthquakes in London by Mike Bartlett, 2010
- Doctor Who Live by Will Brenton and Gareth Roberts, 2010
- Frankenstein adapted from Mary Shelley's novel of the same name by Nick Dear, 2011
- Future Shock by Richard Stockwell, 2011
- The Nether by Jennifer Haley, 2011
- The Crash of the Elysium by Tom MacRae, 2011
- Constellations by Nick Payne, 2012
- Mr. Burns, a Post-Electric Play by Anne Washburn, 2012
- Jerome Bixby's The Man From Earth adapted by Richard Schenkman from Jerome Bixby's film of the same name
- 1984 adapted from George Orwell's novel of the same name by Robert Icke and Duncan MacMillan, 2013
- King Charles III by Mike Bartlett, 2014
- Marjorie Prime by Jordan Harrison, 2014
- The Future Boys Trilogy by Stephen Jordan, 2012–2015
- Game by Mike Bartlett, 2015
- Elegy by Nick Payne, 2016
- Solaris adapted from Stanisław Lem's novel of the same name by David Greig, 2019

== Research ==
There is generally little research on science fiction theatre, but a notable exception is "Science Fiction and the Theatre" by Ralph Willingham and the international conference series on science fiction theatre, "Stage the Future." Contemporary dramatic science fiction scholar Dr. Ian Farnell, examines how science fiction narratives, themes and images have emerged as an evolving dramatic strategy for engaging twenty-first century critical discourse. His work discussing portrayals of A.I. and robotics in caregiving and medical settings, highlights the importance of continued inquiry into the challenges presented by science fiction works, and the unique possibilities for staging and intervening upon these issues through the medium of theatre. Other research projects include the Robot Theatre project by Louise LePage.

== See also ==
- Science fiction opera

== Sources ==
- Willingham, Ralph. Science Fiction and the Theatre. London: Greenwood Press, 1993
