= Whoniverse =

Media franchise and shared fictional universe (1963–present)

- Logo used since November 2023
- Created by: Sydney Newman; C. E. Webber; Donald Wilson
- Original work: Doctor Who
- Owner: BBC
- Years: 1963–present

Print publications
- Book: Doctor Who books
- Comics: Doctor Who comics
- Comic strip: Doctor Who Polystyle comic strip (1964–1979)
- Magazines: Doctor Who Magazine (1979–present); Doctor Who Adventures (2006–2019); Torchwood Magazine (2008–2010)

Films and television
- Films: Dr. Who and the Daleks (1965); Daleks' Invasion Earth 2150 A.D. (1966)
- Short films: Supplementary Doctor Who episodes
- Television series: Doctor Who (1963–2025); K-9 and Company (1981); Torchwood (2006–2011); The Sarah Jane Adventures (2007–2011); K9 (2009–2010); Class (2016); Tales of the TARDIS (2023–2024); The War Between the Land and the Sea (2025); (spin-offs)
- Web series: Tardisodes (2006); Torchwood: Web of Lies (2011)
- Animated series: Death Comes to Time (2001); Real Time (2002); Scream of the Shalka (2003); The Infinite Quest (2007); Dreamland (2009); Daleks! (2020); Doctor Who: TARDIS Crew (forthcoming)
- Television film: Doctor Who (1996)
- Direct-to-video: Wartime (1988); Shakedown: Return of the Sontarans (1994); P.R.O.B.E. (1994–present); Downtime (1995); Auton trilogy (1997–1999); Mindgame (1998–1999); Cyberon (2000); Dæmos Rising (2004); Zygon: When Being You Just Isn't Enough (2008); Sil and the Devil Seeds of Arodor (2019)

Theatrical presentations
- Plays: The Trial of Davros (1993); Doctor Who Live (2010); The Crash of the Elysium (2011)
- Musical: Doctor Who Prom (2008)

Games
- Traditional: Doctor Who – Battles in Time (2006–2009, 2026)
- Role-playing: The Doctor Who Role Playing Game (1985); Time Lord (1991); Doctor Who Roleplaying Game (2009)
- Video games: Doctor Who video games

Audio
- Radio programs: Doctor Who radio stories
- Soundtrack: Doctor Who music releases
- Original music: Music of Doctor Who
- Audio play: Doctor Who audio productions

Miscellaneous
- Toy: Doctor Who merchandise
- Theme park attraction: Doctor Who exhibitions
- Aftershows: Confidential (2005–2011); Totally Doctor Who (2006–2007); Torchwood Declassified (2006–2011); Extra (2014–2015); The Fan Show (2015–2018); Access All Areas (2018, 2025); Unleashed (2023–2025)

The Whoniverse is a British media franchise and shared universe consisting of the BBC television series Doctor Who, its spin-offs, and other associated media. The shared universe nature was established by crossing over common plot elements, settings, cast, and characters, usually deriving from the main programme.

Doctor Who depicts the adventures of a Time Lord called the Doctor, an extraterrestrial being with a human appearance. The Doctor explores the universe in a time-travelling space ship called the TARDIS. With various companions, they combat foes, work to save civilisations, and help people in need.

Doctor Who was first broadcast in 1963 and ran for 26 seasons until 1989, briefly returning in the form of a TV film in 1996. It was later revived in 2005, when the show's newfound success led to the commissioning of several spin-offs—Torchwood (2006–2011), The Sarah Jane Adventures (2007–2011), Class (2016), and The War Between the Land and the Sea (2025). Other spin-offs include the pilot K-9 and Company (1981) and non-BBC produced series K9 (2009–2010).

The franchise name, a portmanteau of the words "who" and "universe", was originally used to describe Doctor Who's production and fanbase. In 2023, the year of the show's sixtieth anniversary, the BBC adopted the name in an official capacity, making the Whoniverse the umbrella brand for all programmes connected to Doctor Who, including documentaries.

The majority of the Whoniverse's programmes have been commercially successful and generally received positive reviews. They have also inspired an extensive collection of book, comic and magazine publications, audio plays, films, video games, exhibitions, and stage plays.

== Background ==
The earliest official usage of "Whoniverse" was in the introduction to the appendices of The Doctor Who Programme Guide Volume 2 by Jean-Marc Lofficier published May 1981 in its hardcover edition. The publicity blurb on the back of The Second Doctor Who Quiz Book by Nigel Robinson published in December 1983 also used the term. In his 1983 book Doctor Who: A Celebration; Two Decades Through Time and Space, Peter Haining called his final chapter "The Whoniverse". The section assembled factual information about all the episodes to date, but also gave information about fan clubs and ancillary entertainments related to the programme. Thus, the term Whoniverse referred to everything connected with the programme behind-the-scenes. In this meaning, standing exhibitions, discussions about the filming of episodes and even the fandom itself were considered part of the "Whoniverse". The term Whoniverse is still used with this definition today, including as the name of a Doctor Who convention in Australia.

The term began to appear in mainstream press coverage, placing greater emphasis on it as a fictional universe, following the popular success of the 2005 Doctor Who revival and the establishment of its spin-offs Torchwood (2006–2011) and The Sarah Jane Adventures (2007–2011).

== Development ==
In October 2022, it was reported that the production company Bad Wolf had filed for a new subsidiary company, run by former Doctor Who executive producer Julie Gardner and former BBC head of drama Jane Tranter, called "Whoniverse1 LTD". On 17 January 2023, outlets reported that a new sign at Wolf Studios Wales possessed the tagline "Home of the Whoniverse".

On 30 October 2023, the BBC announced it would be using the term "Whoniverse" in an official capacity to describe all shows within the orbit of Doctor Who, and specifically their home on BBC iPlayer, including documentary programming. It had previously been announced that over eight hundred previous episodes would be available to stream on BBC iPlayer. A Whoniverse ident was also adopted to unify content within the Whoniverse collection.

== Television ==
Series	Seasons / Series	Episodes	Originally released (UK)	Network
Live-action series
Doctor Who	26	695	23 November 1963 – 6 December 1989	BBC1
Doctor Who	TV film		27 May 1996	CITV-DT / Fox / BBC1
Doctor Who	15	196	26 March 2005 – 31 May 2025	BBC One / Disney+
K-9 and Company	Pilot		28 December 1981	BBC1
Torchwood	4	41	22 October 2006 – 15 September 2011	BBC Three / BBC Two / BBC One / Starz
The Sarah Jane Adventures	5	53	1 January 2007 – 18 October 2011	CBBC / BBC One
K9	1	26	31 October 2009 – 20 November 2010	Network Ten / Disney XD
Class	1	8	22 October – 3 December 2016	BBC Three
Tales of the TARDIS	1	7	1 November 2023 – 20 June 2024	BBC iPlayer / BBC Four
The War Between the Land and the Sea	1	5	7–21 December 2025	BBC One / Disney+
Animated series
Death Comes to Time	1	5	13 July 2001 – 3 May 2002	BBCi
Real Time	1	6	2 August – 6 September 2002	BBCi
Shada	1	6	2 May – 6 June 2003	BBCi
Scream of the Shalka	1	6	13 November – 18 December 2003	BBCi
The Infinite Quest	1	13	2 April – 29 June 2007	CBBC / BBC One
Dreamland	1	6	21–26 November 2009	BBC Red Button
Daleks!	1	5	12 November – 10 December 2020	YouTube
Doctor Who: TARDIS Crew	2	52	2027 – 2029	CBeebies
Web series
Tardisodes	1	13	1 April – 1 July 2006	Mobile
Torchwood: Web of Lies	1	10	9 July – 10 September 2011	iTunes Store

== Films ==
Doctor Who films
Film	UK release date	Directed by	Screenplay by	Produced by
Dr. Who and the Daleks	August 23, 1965	Gordon Flemyng	Milton Subotsky	Milton Subotsky and Max J. Rosenberg
Daleks' Invasion Earth 2150 A.D.	August 5, 1966	Gordon Flemyng	Milton Subotsky and David Whitaker	Milton Subotsky and Max J. Rosenberg

== Stage plays ==
Title	Date premiered	Writer(s)	Premiere venue
The Curse of the Daleks	21 December 1965	David Whitaker and Terry Nation	Wyndham's Theatre, London
Doctor Who and the Daleks in the Seven Keys to Doomsday	16 December 1974	Terrance Dicks	Adelphi Theatre, London
Doctor Who – The Ultimate Adventure	23 March 1989	Terrance Dicks	Wimbledon Theatre, London
The Trial of Davros	14 November 1993; 16 July 2005 (revised)	Kevin Taylor and Michael Wisher	The Village Hotel, Hyde, Greater Manchester; Tameside Hippodrome, Ashton-under-Lyne (revised)
Doctor Who Live	8 October 2010	Will Brenton and Gareth Roberts	Wembley Arena, London
The Crash of the Elysium	1 July 2011	Tom MacRae	MediaCityUK, Salford
Doctor Who: Time Fracture	26 May 2021	Daniel Dingsdale	Davies Mews, London
Doctor Who: The Black Archive	23 July 2025	to be added	San Diego Comic-Con

== Independent video drama ==
There have been several independent video drama spin-offs, most licensing characters and concepts from writers of the classic series of Doctor Who. These have been released direct to video via videotape, DVD, Blu-ray, and online video formats.

Title	Release date	Director	Screenwriter(s)
Reeltime Pictures
Wartime	20 January 1988 (revised version released 1997)	Keith Barnfather	Andy Lane; Helen Stirling
Downtime	2 September 1995	Christopher Barry	Marc Platt
Mindgame	1998	Keith Barnfather	Terrance Dicks
Mindgame Trilogy	January 1999	Keith Barnfather	Terrance Dicks; Miles Richardson; Roger Stevens
Dæmos Rising	14 March 2004	Keith Barnfather	David J. Howe
The White Witch of Devil's End	13 November 2017	Keith Barnfather	Sam Stone; David J. Howe; Raven Dane; Suzanne Barbieri; Debbie Bennett; Jan Edwards
Sil and the Devil Seeds of Arodor	1 November 2019	Keith Barnfather	Philip Martin
Dreamwatch Media
Shakedown: Return of the Sontarans	1 December 1994	Kevin Davies	Terrance Dicks
BBV Productions
P.R.O.B.E.: The Zero Imperative	January 1994	Bill Baggs	Mark Gatiss
P.R.O.B.E.: The Devil of Winterborne	January 1995	Bill Baggs	Mark Gatiss
P.R.O.B.E.: Unnatural Selection	October 1996	Bill Baggs	Mark Gatiss
P.R.O.B.E.: Ghosts of Winterborne	November 1996	Bill Baggs	Mark Gatiss
Auton	1997	Nicholas Briggs	Nicholas Briggs
Auton 2: Sentinel	1998	Nicholas Briggs	Nicholas Briggs
Auton 3	1 June 1999	Bill Baggs; Patricia Merrick	Nicholas Briggs (as "Arthur Wallis"); Paul Ebbs
Cyberon	2000	Bill Baggs	Lance Parkin
Zygon: When Being You Just Isn't Enough	February 2008	Bill Baggs	Lance Parkin; Jonathan Blum (both uncredited)
P.R.O.B.E: When to Die	20 April 2015	Bill Baggs	Bill Baggs
P.R.O.B.E.: Case Files	28 April 2020 – present	Bill Baggs	various

== Escape games ==
Title	Date premiered	Writer(s)	Premiere venue
Worlds Collide	16 January 2019	Escape Hunt	Bristol
A Dalek Awakens	9 March 2020	Escape Hunt	Reading
The Hollow Planet	8 August 2020	Escape Hunt	Print and play game

== Musicals ==
Title	Date premiered	Broadcast	Premiere venue
Doctor Who: A Celebration	19 November 2006	BBC Red Button	Wales Millennium Centre
Doctor Who Prom (2008)	27 July 2008	BBC Radio 3	Royal Albert Hall
Doctor Who Prom (2010)	24 July 2010	BBC Radio 3	Royal Albert Hall
Doctor Who Symphonic Spectacular (Melbourne)	4 February 2012	N/A	Plenary Hall
Doctor Who Symphonic Spectacular (Sydney)	15 December 2012	N/A	Concert Hall
Doctor Who Prom (2013)	13 July 2013	BBC Radio 3	Royal Albert Hall
Doctor Who Symphonic Spectacular (2014)	31 January 2014	N/A	Plenary Hall
Doctor Who Symphonic Spectacular (Australia & New Zealand Tour 2015)	24 January 2015	N/A	Adelaide Entertainment Centre (Australia), Vector Arena (New Zealand)
Doctor Who Symphonic Spectacular (UK Tour 2015)	23 May 2015	N/A	The SSE Arena Wembley
Doctor Who Finale Countdown	17 June 2017	N/A	Wales Millennium Centre
Doctor Who @ 60: A Musical Celebration	12 October 2023	BBC Sounds	Wales Millennium Centre
Doctor Who Prom (2024)	26 August 2024	BBC Radio 3	Royal Albert Hall

== In other media ==
=== Film and television ===
The Whoniverse version of Earth is referred to as Earth-5556 in the Marvel Multiverse.

References to the Whoniverse appear in The Inheritance Cycle fantasy novels by Christopher Paolini.

Doctor Who showrunner Russell T Davies cast John MacKay as John Logie Baird for the episode "The Giggle" (2023), reprising the role he played in Davies' ITV series Nolly earlier in 2023. Davies joked that this casting meant that all the television series he has written are set in the same universe.

Sylvia Trench from James Bond film series appeared in the episode "Joy to the World" (2024), portrayed by Niamh Marie Smith. Writer Steven Moffat stated that in his mind the character is intended to be the same character portrayed by Eunice Gayson in Dr. No (1962) and From Russia with Love (1963).

=== Video games ===
Doctor Who has had 19 video games ranging from computer and browser games, console and mobile. Doctor Who characters have appeared in other games such as Fall Guys, Minecraft, Lego Dimensions, PlayStation Home and LittleBigPlanet 3. The 1992 Doctor Who pinball machine was included in the 2012 pinball video game The Pinball Arcade.

=== Museums and exhibitions ===
There have been various Doctor Who–related exhibitions in the United Kingdom, including the now-closed exhibitions at:

- Land's End, Cornwall
- Blackpool
- Llangollen
- Kelvingrove Museum, Glasgow
- Coventry Transport Museum, Coventry
- Centre for Life, Newcastle upon Tyne
- Melbourne, Australia
- Kensington Olympia Two, London
- Longleat, which ran for 30 years
- Cardiff (the city where the series is filmed)

=== Merchandise ===
Since its beginnings, Doctor Who has generated hundreds of products related to the show, from toys and games to collectible picture cards and postage stamps. These include board games, card games, gamebooks, roleplaying games, action figures and a pinball game. Many games have been released that feature the Daleks.

== See also ==
- List of science fiction universes

== Bibliography ==
- Lofficier, Jean-Marc (1992). The Universal Databank. Virgin Publishing (Target). ISBN 0-426-20370-4.
- Haining, Peter (1983). Doctor Who: A Celebration; Two Decades Through Time and Space. W.H. Allen. ISBN 978-0-491-03351-0.
- Kistler, Alan (2013). Doctor Who: a history. Lyons Press. ISBN 978-0-7627-9188-0.
