= Science fiction opera =

Opera using a science fiction setting

Science fiction opera is a subgenre of science fiction. It refers to operas whose subject-matter fits in the science fiction genre. Like science-fiction literature, science-fiction operas may be set in the future and involve spaceflight or alien invasion. Other science-fiction operas focus on a dystopian view of the future. Like Lorin Maazel's opera 1984, they may be based on a previously written science fiction book.

== List of science fiction operas ==
The following is a partial list of science fiction operas.

- Karl-Birger Blomdahl (1916–1968): Aniara (based on the poem of that name by Harry Martinson)
- Viktor Ullmann (1898–1944): The Emperor of Atlantis
- Eef van Breen (born 1978) ’u’, the first opera in Klingon
- Gavin Bryars (born 1943): Doctor Ox's Experiment (based on the book by Jules Verne)
- Søren Nils Eichberg (born 1973): Oryx and Crake (based on the novel by Margaret Atwood)
- Philip Glass (born 1937): The Making of the Representative for Planet 8 and The Marriages Between Zones Three, Four and Five (based on the books by Doris Lessing), 1000 Airplanes on the Roof, and The Voyage
- Joseph Haydn (1732–1809) Il mondo della luna (The World of the Moon), 1777
- Leoš Janáček (1854–1928): The Makropulos Affair (based on the play by Karel Čapek), premiered 1926; and The Excursions of Mr. Brouček to the Moon and to the 15th Century (1920)
- Karel Janovický (b 1930): The Utmost Sail (1958) a one act opera inspired by the launch of the satellite Sputnik in 1957. It concerns the crew of a space ship flying into space and watching the Earth being consumed in a nuclear holocaust.
- Lorin Maazel (1930–2014) 1984 (based on the book by George Orwell)
- Tod Machover (born 1953) Valis (1987) (based on the novel VALIS by Philip K. Dick)
- Gian Carlo Menotti (1911–2007) A Bride from Pluto (1982) and Help, Help, the Globolinks! (1968)
- Jacques Offenbach (1819-1880) Le voyage dans la lune (based on the book De la terre à la lune by Jules Verne), premiered 1875.
- Poul Ruders (born 1949) The Handmaid's Tale (based on the book of that name by Margaret Atwood)
- Howard Shore (born 1946): The Fly (based on David Cronenberg's 1986 film)
- Karlheinz Stockhausen (1928–2007) Licht (based on The Urantia Book)
- Steven Andrew Taylor's Paradises Lost after a short story from Ursula K. Le Guin's collection The Birthday of the World
- Michael Tippett's New Year (1989), which features a spaceship and time travelers from the future.

== See also ==
- Science fiction theatre
- Space opera
