= Doctor Who spinoffs =

Works tied to British sci-fi TV series

Doctor Who spinoffs refers to material created outside of, but related to, the long-running British science fiction television series Doctor Who.

Both during the main run of the series from 1963 to 1989 and after its cancellation, numerous novels, comic strips, comic books and other material were generated based on the characters and situations introduced in the show. These spinoffs continued to be produced even without a television series to support them and helped keep the show alive in the minds of its fans and the public until the programme was revived in 2005.

This entry mainly concentrates on "official" spinoffs, that is to say, material sanctioned by the British Broadcasting Corporation, which produces the series, as well as material sanctioned by the copyright holders of characters from the series.

One aspect of Doctor Who spinoffs which makes them different from many spinoffs from other science fiction franchises is that many of the television writers and stars have been directly involved in the production of spinoffs. For example, it has become common for a former television actor to reprise their character for an audio play.

The BBC holds no position on Doctor Who canon. Although the spinoffs generally do not intentionally contradict the television series, the various spinoff series do occasionally contradict each other.

== Television ==
=== Official spinoff productions ===
The first spinoff attempt that actually reached the production stage appeared in 1981, when a 50-minute pilot episode for a series to be called K-9 and Company was aired. It focused on the adventures of former Doctor Who companions Sarah Jane Smith and K-9, a robot dog. The pilot, subtitled "A Girl's Best Friend", despite receiving high ratings of 8.4 million, was not commissioned for a development into a series, though Sarah Jane and K-9 would later reappear together on the main Doctor Who series and her adventures would be continued in audio form by Big Finish Productions in the 2000s.

Since the return of Doctor Who in 2005, the show was accompanied by a documentary series, Doctor Who Confidential, broadcast on BBC Three. Episodes were also edited to a 15-minute run time and rebroadcast with the title Doctor Who Confidential: Cut Down; these edited versions were included on the Doctor Who DVD releases. In 2011, Confidential was among several shows cancelled by BBC Three to free up space for new programming.

Following the success of the first series of the revived Doctor Who, a new spinoff titled Torchwood became the first to be commissioned as a full television series. In contrast to its parent show, Torchwood was initially conceived by creator Russell T Davies as an "adult" programme to be broadcast post-watershed. It is set in modern-day Cardiff and revolves around a team investigating alien activities and crime. The series features John Barrowman, playing former Ninth Doctor companion Jack Harkness, police officer Gwen Cooper, computer expert Toshiko Sato, medic Owen Harper and "support man", Ianto Jones. The first episode aired 22 October 2006 and received a record BBC Three (and all British cable television record for a locally produced non-sporting event) high rating of 2.4 million viewers. The first series (Oct '06 – Jan '07) comprised 13 episodes broadcast on BBC Three, and was followed by a second 13-part series (Jan '08 – Apr '08) broadcast on BBC Two. A third series was written as a five-part mini-series titled Torchwood: Children of Earth, airing on five consecutive nights from to 10 July 2009 on BBC One. A fourth series was similarly structured as a single story told as a ten-part mini-series, titled Torchwood: Miracle Day; unlike previous series, Miracle Day was a co-production between the BBC and the US cable television network Starz. The fourth series premiered on 8 July 2011 on Starz in the US and on 14 July 2011 on BBC One in the United Kingdom.

The 2006 and 2007 series were companioned with a CBBC show entitled Totally Doctor Who. Series 1 was presented by CBBC and Smile presenter Barney Harwood and Blue Peter presenter Liz Barker. For the show's second series Barker was replaced by SMart presenter Kirsten O'Brien. During the second series, an animated serial, The Infinite Quest, was featured. David Tennant and Freema Agyeman reprised their roles from the live-action television series while Anthony Head, a guest star during the 2006 season, returned in a different role.

A second major spinoff of Doctor Who was The Sarah Jane Adventures, created for a younger audience on CBBC, starring Elisabeth Sladen as the Doctor's former companion Sarah Jane Smith. It began with a 60-minute pilot episode co-written by Davies and Gareth Roberts, premiering on BBC One and the CBBC channel on New Year's Day 2007; the full series started on 24 September 2007, consisting of two-part serials with half-hour individual episodes. Five series were produced altogether, the first four series consisting of twelve episodes each; the fifth series was truncated with only six episodes having been produced before Sladen's death in 2011, as a result of which the programme was cancelled. Sarah Jane's Alien Files, a spinoff of The Sarah Jane Adventures, aired along with the fourth series in 2010.

A second animated serial, Dreamland, aired on CBBC in Autumn 2009. David Tennant voiced the Tenth Doctor, and the serial also starred Georgia Tennant (who appeared in Doctor Who's 2008 series as the Doctor's daughter, Jenny).

On 24 April 2006 The Independent, the Daily Star and The Times confirmed, following past rumours, that K-9 would be featured in a 26-part animated children's series, K-9, to be written by Bob Baker. The article in The Times also featured a picture of the redesigned K-9 for the animated series. Each episode was 30 minutes long, made by Jetix Europe and London-based distribution unit Park Entertainment. According to a report in Broadcast magazine, the BBC opted out of involvement in order to focus on Torchwood. K-9 was first premiered on 31 October 2009. The 26th and final episode was aired on 25 September 2010.

On 1 October 2015 the BBC announced a new spinoff titled, Class, which is set in Coal Hill School. It premiered on BBC Three on 22 October 2016. The eight-episode series is written by Patrick Ness. In March 2016, it was announced that Greg Austin would be cast as Charlie. On 7 September 2017, BBC Three controller Damian Kavanagh confirmed that the series had been cancelled.

A new animated series called Daleks!, which consists of five 10-minute long episodes, was released on the official Doctor Who YouTube channel in 2020.

On 30 October 2023, it was announced that "The Whoniverse", a new section on BBC iPlayer dedicated to Doctor Who content, would release spinoffs, with the first being Tales of the TARDIS which first premiered on 1 November 2023.

On 27 January 2023, Davies confirmed that future Doctor Who spinoffs were in the works. A spinoff miniseries titled The War Between the Land and the Sea, written by Davies and Pete McTighe, centered around UNIT, and starring Russell Tovey and Gugu Mbatha-Raw, aired on BBC One in December 2025, and will air on Disney+ in 2026.

==== Future television spinoffs ====
Doctor Who: TARDIS Crew is being developed to be an animated spin-off for pre-school audiences, set to air on CBeebies from 2027 to 2029, first announced in June 2025 when the BBC was seeking a production company to work on it, later confirmed to be Blue Zoo. On 6 October 2026, the BBC released a teaser image and official title for the series, featuring a young Doctor and his companions pursued by the Daleks, with the TARDIS visible in the background.

=== Charity ===
Doctor Who also appeared on television in the form of special one-off productions to benefit charity. In 1993, Dimensions in Time was produced for the benefit of Children in Need, coinciding with the series' 30th anniversary. It was a special in two parts, running about 12 minutes in total, which featured all surviving Doctors (including Tom Baker in his first appearance as the character since 1981), and more than a dozen former companions. Not meant to be taken seriously, the story had the Rani opening a hole in time, cycling the Doctor and his companions through his previous incarnations and menacing them with monsters from the show's past. It also featured a crossover with the soap opera EastEnders, the action taking place in the latter's Albert Square location.

In 1999, Doctor Who and the Curse of Fatal Death, a parody starring Rowan Atkinson as a future incarnation of the Doctor in his final battle with the Master (Jonathan Pryce), was created for the charity Comic Relief. During the parody's climax, when the Doctor regenerates several times, actors Richard E. Grant, Hugh Grant, Jim Broadbent and Joanna Lumley all had a chance to play the character. Richard E. Grant would go on to play another unofficial incarnation of the Doctor for the webcast of Scream of the Shalka. BBC Video released the special in the same format as regular Doctor Who releases.

A second Children in Need special, but one that was part of the series' continuity, was produced for the charity's 2005 appeal. This 7-minute "mini-episode" starred David Tennant as the Tenth Doctor and Billie Piper as Rose Tyler, and filled in a gap between the episodes "The Parting of the Ways" and "The Christmas Invasion".

A third Children in Need special, but one that was part of the series' continuity, was produced for the charity's 2007 appeal. "Time Crash" starred David Tennant as the Tenth Doctor and Peter Davison as the Fifth Doctor, and filled in a gap between the episodes "Last of the Time Lords" and "Voyage of the Damned". This takes part directly after Martha leaves the TARDIS, and ends when the Titanic crashes into the TARDIS.

For the 2011 Comic Relief Red Nose Day appeal a two-part story was shown. It starred Matt Smith, Karen Gillan and Arthur Darvill and did not have any guest stars.

=== Unmade ===
The first attempt to produce a spinoff television series for Doctor Who occurred in the mid-1960s when Terry Nation attempted to launch a US-produced serialised series focusing on the Daleks. A pilot-episode script entitled The Destroyers was written but no pilot film was ever produced. Years later, an outline of the story (which would have featured at least one character, Sara Kingdom, later featured in the parent series) appeared in The Official Doctor Who & the Daleks Book. The US Dalek pilot was released on audio by Big Finish Productions in 2010 as part of the Lost Stories series, with actress Jean Marsh reprising the role of Sara.

There was some discussion about spinning off the characters of Henry Gordon Jago and Professor George Litefoot from the 1977 serial The Talons of Weng-Chiang into their own series, but this was not taken forward on television (although it has been produced on audio).

The concept art for an animated Doctor Who series was produced by the Canadian animation company Nelvana in the 1980s, but the series was not produced.

CBBC originally expressed an interest in a Young Doctor Who series, chronicling the childhood of the Doctor. Russell T Davies vetoed this concept, saying "somehow, the idea of a fourteen-year-old Doctor, on Gallifrey inventing sonic screwdrivers, takes away from the mystery and intrigue of who he is and where he came from,". He instead suggested The Sarah Jane Adventures (see above).

A further spinoff of Doctor Who—Rose Tyler: Earth Defence, a 90-minute special that could possibly become an annual event—was cancelled by Davies at a late stage of its development. He considered it to be "a spin-off too far", despite the production having been commissioned and budgeted by the controller of BBC One.

== Prose fiction ==
=== Novelisations ===
Novelisations based upon individual Doctor Who serials were first published in the mid-1960s, the first being Dr. Who in an Exciting Adventure with the Daleks by David Whitaker, a loose adaptation of the show's second serial, The Daleks. Doctor Who novelisations continued in the early 1970s when Target Books (initially published by Universal-Tandem, later to become part of W.H. Allen & Co and then Virgin Publishing) began publishing them on a regular basis. The first three novels (all featuring the First Doctor) were republished editions of the mid-1960s books, and new books, initially featuring the Third Doctor, followed from 1974.

The initial three novelisations had been published in various editions both inside and outside the United Kingdom (editions appeared in the Netherlands, Canada and the United States). Further foreign editions of the novelisations appeared from the 1970s, with the books being translated for readers in the Netherlands, Brazil, Turkey, the US (where the texts were slightly tweaked to eliminate unfamiliar Anglicisms), Japan, West Germany, Portugal, France and Finland.

Every televised story from 1963 to 1996 was published by Target Books (which became part of Ebury Publishing's BBC Books imprint since 2018) by 2021. Five of these—The TV Movie, City of Death, The Pirate Planet, Resurrection of the Daleks, and Revelation of the Daleks—had differing BBC Books versions printed from 1996–2019. Other novelisations include radio serials (Slipback), stories slated for the "missing season" but never produced due to the 18-month hiatus in 1985–1986 (The Nightmare Fair, The Ultimate Evil and Mission to Magnus), the spinoff K-9 and Company, and even a 1976 children's story record (The Pescatons). (The Target logo was retained for later reprints and intermittent new titles up to 1994 and was by this time used exclusively for Doctor Who.)

Most of these novelisations contained minimal amounts of original material and were (usually) adapted closely from the shooting scripts, with the intent of the books being souvenirs of previously aired shows in the pre-VCR era; the decision by the BBC to delete many episodes from the Hartnell, Troughton and Pertwee eras resulted in many of these books becoming the only way for these "lost" adventures to be experienced prior to the release of soundtracks for those episodes and/or recovery of lost episodes. Although novelisations became more elaborate in later years, the early books usually followed a set formula and were for a time restricted to a maximum page length as they were considered children's literature.

Not all Target novelisations faithfully followed the scripts. John Lucarotti's The Massacre (1987) completely changed the plot of the source serial, The Massacre of St Bartholomew's Eve. Some guide books (notably 1999's A Critical Guide to Doctor Who on Television by Kenneth Muir) describe the plot of the novel rather than the original serial due to the fact the original serial is one of the many that were lost. Also, when Target launched the novelisation line, there was no inkling that ultimately more than 150 of the show's storylines would be adapted; as a result, there are numerous continuity gaps between early Target books and the scripts and/or later published novelisations; one example is Doctor Who and the Doomsday Weapon (based upon Colony in Space) which as written depicts Jo Grant's first adventure with the Doctor, even though the television series introduced her several serials earlier in Terror of the Autons (which was novelised at a later date and ignored the discrepancy). Authors sometimes added epilogues to their novelisations which were at odds with other material: The Curse of Fenric by Ian Briggs suggested a fate for Ace that differed from later original novels, and Philip Martin's adaptation of the Mindwarp segment of The Trial of a Time Lord included an ending that completely contradicted the scripted ending of the televised serial.

A one-time return to serial novelisations occurred in 2004 when BBC Books novelised the made-for-Internet adventure, Scream of the Shalka.

After Virgin began its New Adventures and Missing Adventures line of original novels in 1991, it also published several additional novelisations both on their own and under the Missing Adventures label. These were two Dalek stories from the Troughton era, The Power of the Daleks and The Evil of the Daleks, along with another radio novelisation The Paradise of Death.

The Ghosts of N-Space, a second radio serial featuring Jon Pertwee produced in the mid-1990s was novelised by Virgin, as were several non BBC spinoff video productions such as Shakedown (as one section of a larger original novel) and Downtime, adding an air of official sanction to them.

The unmade stories Shada, The Krikkitmen, and Doctor Who Meets Scratchman were novelised by BBC Books from 2012–2019. Elements of The Krikkitmen had also been used by its original author Douglas Adams in his 1982 novel Life, the Universe and Everything. None of these have paperback versions with the Target imprint.

Three novels of the original run were rewritten as audiobook exclusives, but were later published in print, once again by Target:

- The Stones of Blood, rewritten by David Fisher (audiobook released 5 May 2011, print version released 14 July 2022)
- The Androids of Tara, rewritten by David Fisher (audiobook released 5 July 2012, print version released 14 July 2022)
- Warriors' Gate and Beyond, rewritten and expanded by Stephen Gallagher (audiobook released 4 April 2019, print version released 13 July 2023)

Another novel from the Virgin era, The Evil of the Daleks, was re-adapted by Frazer Hines in hardback in 2023 and paperback in 2024.

In 2007, Penguin Books revived the novelisations concept for the spinoff series, The Sarah Jane Adventures. As of early 2010, all stories from the series' first season, two from the second, and one from the third, have been adapted. The third-season novelisation, adapting "The Wedding of Sarah Jane Smith", marked the first appearance of the Doctor in a TV-based novelisation since the 1996 TV movie was adapted.

In 2018, BBC Books began a line adaptations of episodes from the 21st-century revival of Doctor Who as part of "The Target Collection".

=== Original fiction ===
The earliest original Doctor Who spinoff fiction appeared in children's annuals from 1964, and over the years many short stories, novellas and full-length novels have been published.

==== Short stories and novellas ====
The earliest original Doctor Who fiction were short stories that appeared in the official BBC Doctor Who annuals, which were published from 1964 to 1985 (and later revived by Marvel Comics as Doctor Who Year Books and as annuals by the BBC in 2005). A 45-page novella titled Doctor Who and the Invasion from Space, published in 1966, is the earliest known original long-form prose Doctor Who adventure.

Short stories also appeared in other venues such as two anniversary specials produced by the editors of the Radio Times. The first of these (1973) was Terry Nation's "We Are the Daleks!" while the second (1983) had Eric Saward's "Birth of a Renegade". The former explains the origins of the Daleks and the latter reveals the background of Susan, but both contradict the series and many other stories on the subject. There were also stories in newspapers and comics, storybooks and even serials published on confectionery wrappers and trading cards. In 1979, Nation wrote "Daleks: The Secret Invasion", a novella included in Terry Nation's Dalek Special; this was the first original Doctor Who-related fiction to be published by Target Books.

During the 1990s, Virgin Publishing launched a series of Doctor Who-based short story anthologies titled Decalog. A total of five volumes were published, and the last two, Decalog 4 and Decalog 5 were published after Virgin had lost the Doctor Who franchise and did not feature the Doctor. Decalog 4 concentrated on the family of Roz Forrester—a companion introduced in the NAs—over a thousand-year time span.

Also during the 1990s, Marvel Comics commissioned the writers of the various original novels under Virgin's New and Missing Adventures lines (see below) to write short pieces entitled "Preludes" which were run in Doctor Who Magazine. These short stories (never more than one magazine page in length) usually focused on an event just prior to a particular novel, or on a character prior to his or her encounter with the Doctor. Some non-novel related short stories titled "Brief Encounters" were also written, including one in which the Seventh Doctor met a future incarnation of himself. (The illustration accompanying this story based the future Doctor on actor Nicholas Briggs, who had played the Doctor in unauthorised audio dramas produced by the fan group Audio Visuals. The Briggs Doctor also appeared in the DWM comic strip.)

BBC Books, after it took over the licence to publish original Doctor Who fiction, published several Decalog-style anthologies in the late 1990s under variations of the title Short Trips. Big Finish Productions later obtained a license to produce hardback short story anthologies and appropriated the Short Trips title; Big Finish has also published short story collections featuring Bernice Summerfield, a former companion of the Seventh and Eighth Doctors.

In the early 2000s, Telos Publishing produced a series of original Doctor Who novellas, published individually in hardcover; the first, Time and Relative by Kim Newman, was released on 23 November 2001. Although the series was reasonably successful (in spite of the odd publication format, which resulted from the BBC having reserved for its own use the rights to publish Doctor Who story collections and Doctor Who books in paperback), the BBC chose not to renew Telos's licence, and the series ended in March 2004, having completed 15 novellas featuring the Doctor. Prior to losing the license, a small number of Telos releases were re-issued in paperback form (albeit in a larger format than the BBC Books releases) following a separate agreement with the BBC.

Telos subsequently launched a new series of novellas, Time Hunter, featuring characters created for the Doctor Who novella, The Cabinet of Light while Obverse Books has published novels and short story collections featuring the character of Iris Wildthyme from the BBC book range, and others using the setting and characters created by Stephen Wyatt for the tv episode Paradise Towers. Obverse also currently publishes books based on Faction Paradox, created by Lawrence Miles for the BBC book range (previous books in the same setting were released by Mad Norwegian Press and Random Static).

In 2006, BBC Books launched an annual series of Doctor Who novellas as part of the government-sponsored "Quick Reads Initiative" which were shorter stories (generally less than one hundred pages) intended to promote literacy in younger readers. The cover formats were the same as that for the New Series Adventures, however the books are published in paperbacks and do not have the same international distribution as the hardcovers. The first Quick Reads release was I Am a Dalek by Gareth Roberts. Released in March 2006, it was actually the first original Tenth Doctor novel to be released, predating the first series of full-length Tenth Doctor novels by a month. Further volumes were released until 2013.

==== Novels ====
After years of only novelisations being published, the first full-length original Doctor Who-related novels appeared in 1986 when Target launched a series of books titled The Companions of Doctor Who which were original works focusing on the Doctor's former assistants. The first two books were Turlough and the Earthlink Dilemma by Tony Attwood, published in July 1986 based upon the character played by Mark Strickson in the early 1980s and Harry Sullivan's War written by Ian Marter, who had actually played Harry Sullivan on the series a decade earlier, published in October 1986. Other novels would have featured Tegan, the Brigadier, Victoria and Mike Yates. Victoria eventually was the focus of the novel (and subsequent video) Downtime by Marc Platt. Yates would have appeared in The Killing Stone by actor Richard Franklin, but the novel was never published, although an abridged recording by Franklin based on the book appeared in 2002.

In 1989, Target launched another short-lived series of "original" novels, this time titled The Missing Episodes and based upon serials commissioned for but never produced for the cancelled 1985–1986 season. Again, only three books were published, the first being The Nightmare Fair by Graham Williams in May 1989, followed by The Ultimate Evil by Wally K. Daly in August 1989, and Mission to Magnus by Philip Martin in July 1990.

Virgin Publishing's line of original novels, the New Adventures, featuring the Seventh Doctor began in July 1991 with Timewyrm: Genesys by John Peel, and were billed as telling "stories too broad and deep for the small screen". Virgin's predecessors, Target Books and W. H. Allen Ltd, had by this point been publishing novelisations for twenty years, and even before the series had come to a conclusion, successive editors of the range such as Nigel Robinson and Peter Darvill-Evans had identified the need for original material to complement the few stories there were left to be novelised. The first four New Adventures were a single story arc called Timewyrm, and the first volume was controversial for including sexuality and violence of a level not encountered in the Target Books range. A second story arc, the three-volume Cat's Cradle followed, after which the NA range settled into a mixture of standalone and arc stories.

The New Adventures were joined in 1994 by a companion series (the Missing Adventures) telling "untold" stories with earlier Doctors, set between episodes of the television series. At its height, new novels in both lines were being published monthly. Many authors of these books went on to write for the revival of Doctor Who in 2005: Russell T Davies, Paul Cornell, Gareth Roberts, Matt Jones and Mark Gatiss. Indeed, if one counts Steven Moffat's contribution to the second Decalog collection, then about 75% of episodes of the new series were written by people who contributed to the Virgin line. (The same cannot be said of the BBC Books line. In fact, no writer who made their Doctor Who debut on the BBC Books line has written for the new series. The only writers to have contributed to the BBC line and the new series are those who also wrote for the Virgin line—Gatiss, who wrote two BBC books, and Cornell, who wrote one. Several writers from the BBC line have written tie-in novels for the new series, however, including editors Justin Richards and Stephen Cole.)

In the climate of renewed interest in the series that followed the 1996 telemovie, the BBC decided to reclaim Virgin's licence when it next came up for renewal and publish its own series of Doctor Who novels. The last two Virgin Doctor Who novels were released in April 1997, bringing to an end almost 25 years of Doctor Who publishing outside of the BBC, with the first two BBC-published novels released in June that same year.

Virgin, meanwhile, continued the New Adventures line for several years afterward, focusing upon the Doctor's former assistant, Professor Bernice Summerfield who had been the first companion created specifically for literature, rather than for television. These books (sometimes referred to informally as The Adventures of Benny Summerfield) gained their own fan following and featured appearances by other characters created specifically for the literary world of Doctor Who.

The BBC began releasing two new novels every two months, one featuring the ongoing adventures of the Eighth Doctor and the other an "untold" story of an earlier Doctor, referred to as the Eighth Doctor Adventures (EDAs) and Past Doctor Adventures (PDAs) respectively. Although many authors who wrote for the Virgin line returned to write for the BBC series, direct continuity between the two sets of books was discouraged, at least initially. Later, the editors loosened their policy on links between the Virgin and BBC novels, even publishing direct sequels to novels by the other publisher; for example, Justin Richards' Millennium Shock was a sequel to his earlier Virgin Missing Adventure System Shock. For the most part, however, links between the fictional ranges were kept deliberately oblique so as not to alienate new readers.

In 2004, the BBC almost halved the frequency of publication from 22 books a year (one EDA and one PDA per month) to 12, each release now coming out once every other month. When the new television series began in 2005, the EDAs came to an end, with future novels featuring the Eighth Doctor to be part of the PDA range. A new line of New Series Adventures began with three Ninth Doctor novels in May 2005; another three Ninth Doctor novels followed the same year. After this the series continued in 2006 with original novels featuring the Tenth through Fifteenth Doctors, with the books periodically changing every year to feature the current Doctor on television.

Beginning in 2012, hardback books featuring past Doctors are being published, though at a much reduced rate compared with the pre-2005 output. The books are longer, in a larger format, and written by (or in once case, adapted from earlier work by) prominent science fiction authors. As of the beginning of 2012, the three titles announced are Shada by Gareth Roberts (a novelisation of the unbroadcast television story by Douglas Adams), The Wheel of Ice by Stephen Baxter and Harvest of Time by Alastair Reynolds.

The ninth Doctor novel The Monsters Inside by Stephen Cole is the first spinoff novel to be referred to in the television series — in the episode "Boom Town", the Doctor and Rose's trip to the Justicia system is mentioned. In 2007, Paul Cornell's NA novel, Human Nature, was adapted (with significant changes) as the two-part story Human Nature and The Family of Blood.

By far, the most prolific writer of Doctor Who fiction is Terrance Dicks, who has written well over 70 titles including Target Books novelisations and original works for both the Virgin and BBC Books series. In March 2007, his first work for the revived series, the Tenth Doctor adventure Made of Steel, was released in the Quick Reads format. This was the first original novel published featuring companion Martha Jones.

A number of characters created for original Doctor Who fiction have been spun off into series of their own, such as the comic book Miranda based upon a character created for Lance Parkin's novel Father Time, though the comic was not a success and was cancelled after three issues. First Mad Norwegian Press and later Random Static published a series of Faction Paradox books, based on the characters created by Lawrence Miles for the novel Alien Bodies, and also republished one of the Bernice Summerfield novels originally published by Virgin. Similarly, Chris Cwej received a novel series of his own from Arcbeatle Press, Cwej.

== Comics ==
=== Polystyle-era comic strip (1964–1979) ===
Comic strip adventures of the Doctor appeared almost from the beginning of the television series. The first phase has become known as the 'Polystyle era' (1964–1979) of Doctor Who comic strips. Paul Scoones, an historian of the Doctor Who comic strip, writes: 'First launched in the pages of TV Comic in November 1964, the comic strip version of Doctor Who is just one year younger than the television series on which it is based. The strip appeared almost every week: first in TV Comic, then in Countdown and TV Action before returning to TV Comic. All these titles were produced by a company called Polystyle Publications (formally TV Publications), which held the rights to publish a Doctor Who comic [strip] until May 1979 when the last installment of the strip appeared'. Both the First and Second Doctors were, for a time, shown travelling with two youngsters named John and Gillian who are identified as the Doctor's grandchildren. Their place within established continuity has challenged fans ever since, although attempts have been made to reconcile their existence in various spinoff fiction venues.

=== Dalek comics ===
At the height of "Dalekmania" in the 1960s, a comic strip featuring the Daleks written by Alan Fennell and Doctor Who Script Editor David Whitaker, but credited to Terry Nation, appeared in the Gerry Anderson TV Century 21 comic magazine. The BBC also published a number of Dalek Annuals which contained a mixture of comic strips and prose short stories, and, in later volumes, reprints of the TV Century 21 stories. Although much of the material in these strips directly contradicted what was shown on television later, concepts such as the Daleks' use of humanoid duplicates and the design of the Dalek Emperor would later appear in the series. The TV Century also featured the Daleks' enemies the Mechanoids, the spherical robots seen in The Chase.

An early Dalek Annual featured the Doctor's companion Sara Kingdom and the Space Security Service in stories set prior to her death while.

=== Doctor Who Magazine and related publications (1979–present) ===
Comic strips, both starring the Doctor and other Doctor Who characters, appeared in the pages of Doctor Who Magazine. This began as a Marvel comic under the name Doctor Who Weekly in 1979, which soon changed its title Doctor Who Monthly. The magazine continued to be published between 1990 and 2005 during which, apart from one-off productions, Doctor Who had gone off the air.

The comic strip has usually featured the current Doctor in a series of adventures independent of the novels and the audios, and with another companion, though several crossovers with the worlds of the audio and literary Doctor Who and the comics have occurred. Creators who have worked on the DWM strip include such notables as writer Alan Moore and artists Dave Gibbons, Mike McMahon and John Ridgway. Selected stories were reprinted in North America by Marvel Comics, which was also the publisher of Doctor Who Magazine at the time. WithDWM was published by Marvel, characters occasionally crossed over between the Doctor Who comic and other titles published by Marvel UK; these include the froglike Venusian businessman Josiah Dogbolter and the robotic bounty hunter Death's Head.

The "Flood Barriers" feature in the trade paperback Doctor Who: The Flood, it was revealed that the comic writers had the opportunity to depict the Eighth Doctor's regeneration into the Ninth Doctor, but declined when Davies refused to allow them to give the Ninth Doctor a companion prior to Rose Tyler.

The publishers of Doctor Who Magazine have also produced many the spinoff publications including Doctor Who Adventures, Doctor Who Classic Comics and many other special publications and annuals which include comics.

Doctor Who Magazine, which is now owned by Panini Comics since 1995 and continues to produce new comic strip adventures. Panini has reprinted many of the early DWM strips in trade paperback format and ran a series of annuals called doctor who storybooks from 2005-2009 featuring the current companion/s at the time and the ninth and tenth doctor and in 2005 the first annual to feature the Ninth Doctor and Rose Tyler was printed by Panini but in 2006 it began to be printed by Penguin Books but their logo didn’t appear on the annuals until the 2016 annual.

=== IDW series ===
At the 2007 San Diego Comic-Con, IDW Publishing announced their intention to publish a new series of Doctor Who comics, which would follow the adventures of the Tenth Doctor and Martha Jones. The series was scripted by Gary Russell, with art by Nick Roche, and was slated to launch later that year. IDW published this title alongside Doctor Who Classics, republishing Doctor Who Weekly and Monthly stories drawn by Dave Gibbons with new coloring. Subsequently, this was split into two publications titled Doctor Who, a six-issue mini-series, and Doctor Who Classics respectively. A second mini-series, Doctor Who: The Forgotten, by Tony Lee and Pia Guerra, began its release in August 2008 and deals with the Tenth Doctor recalling previous Doctors' adventures as an aid to fight off forced amnesia. Married writing team John Reppion and Leah Moore, together with artist Ben Templesmith, scripted one-shot The Whispering Gallery, which was released in February 2009. This initiated a series of one-shots which included The Time Machination, by Tony Lee and Paul Grist, in May 2009, and Autopia, by John Ostrander and Kelly Yates, in June.

It was announced Tony Lee in February 2009 at New York Comic Con that Tony Leewould write an ongoing series.

=== Titan series ===
On 21 January 2014, BBC Worldwide and Titan Comics announced a new deal to publish Doctor Who inedited stories featuring the Tenth, Eleventh and the Twelfth Doctors.

=== Other comics ===
The regular Doctor Who Annuals from World Distributors published comics most years from the first annual in 1965 until they ceased producing Doctor Who annuals in 1985. But when annuals were brought back in 2005 more annual comics and short stories were published and continue to be as of 27/4/24

In 2005 a webcomic called The Forge: project Longinus, written by Cavan Scott and Mark Wright and illustrated by Bryan Coyle was produced as a spinoff from Scott and Wright's Big Finish Productions Doctor Who audio dramas, and contained a number of unofficial references to the Doctor Who universe.

Two short-lived spinoff series, Miranda from Comeuppance Comics and Faction Paradox from Mad Norwegian Press, have also appeared, both featuring characters who had debuted in Doctor Who novels.

== Films ==
=== Cinema ===
Two Doctor Who movies produced by Max J. Rosenberg and Milton Subotsky were released in the mid-1960s, loosely adapted on the first two Dalek serials: Dr. Who and the Daleks (1965) and Daleks' Invasion Earth 2150 A.D. (1966). Neither film takes place in televised continuity. They both star Peter Cushing as Dr. Who, a human scientist who invents a time machine, Tardis, with early companions Ian, Barbara and Susan, also reimagined.

From 1987 to 1994, the Daltenreys group, George Dugdale, Peter Mackenzie Litten and John Humphreys, also tried to develop a Doctor Who movie for theatrical release, the script for which was worked on for a time by Johnny Byrne, who had previously worked on the television series. The license for this reverted to the BBC before the film neared production. The book The Nth Doctor by Jean-Marc Lofficier (Virgin Publishing, 1997) includes synopses of several proposed film story treatments, including those by Byrne.

Following K9, a second series was planned but was canceled in favor of a film titled K9: TimeQuake, set to release in 2017. In September 2018, it was announced the film had been delayed due to "a new multimillion dollar series" in partnership with a major US/UK company, intended to reestablish the "K9 brand" before the film. In December 2020, Megabytes, an anthology book featuring K9, was released, which was teased as being "the road to TimeQuake." When Bob Baker died in November 2021, the official Twitter page released a statement saying "Bob had recently completed scripts for both a new K9 film and TV series, which will continue in tribute to Bob and his legacy,", however, as of March 2025, this was the final message posted on the account and there is no other information available to suggest the project is still active.

=== Video ===
The hunger for more Doctor Who on television, especially between the show's cancellation in 1989 and its return in 2005, was partly answered by direct-to-video productions by various companies. The BBC has never authorised any Doctor Who video productions but production companies have been able to license individual characters and alien races from the show directly from the writers who created them, and feature them in adventures of their own.

Companies who have released videos of this kind include Reeltime Pictures (also known for the long-running Myth Makers series of documentaries) and BBV (who have also released a number of Doctor Who-related audio adventures on the same basis). The first spinoff of this nature was Wartime, a half-hour film produced by Reeltime in the late 1980s and starring John Levene as Benton, a UNIT soldier who appeared on Doctor Who in the early to mid-1970s. In the 1990s, Reeltime distributed P.R.O.B.E., a series of four made-for-video movies featuring Caroline John as her Pertwee-era character Liz Shaw. BBV, on their part, produced and released a trilogy of movies, Auton, Auton 2: Sentinel and Auton 3: Awakening that featured UNIT battling the Nestene Consciousness. Author Terrance Dicks also wrote and produced Shakedown: Return of the Sontarans in 1994, which not only featured the reappearance of one of the series' most famous monsters, but also starred series alums Carole Ann Ford, Sophie Aldred and Michael Wisher. Jan Chappell played Lisa Deranne, captain of the solar racing yacht Tiger Moth, whose shakedown cruise is interrupted by a Sontaran attack squad furiously searching for a Rutan infiltrator. Another spinoff, Downtime, featured the return of Nicholas Courtney as Brigadier (Ret.) Lethbridge-Stewart and Elisabeth Sladen as Sarah Jane Smith, along with Deborah Watling as Troughton-era companion Victoria Waterfield. More of a nostalgia trip for fans than anything, Downtime provided a more detailed look at Lethbridge-Stewart's family and legacy than had ever been seen before. Reeltime Pictures also produced three other Doctor Who-universe related videos, Dæmos Rising, Mindgame and Mindgame Trilogy. In November 2017 they released White Witch of Devil's End, a six part Reeltime Pictures independent drama starring Damaris Hayman as Olive Hawthorne, who made her original appearance in Doctor Who in the Jon Pertwee story "The Dæmons".

In 1998 a video was released called Lust in Space in which the "Time Assizes" (Time Lords) put Doctor Who on trial for sexism. If it is found to be sexist, then it will be removed from history. None of the actors who had played the part of the Doctor took part. The "evidence" for the trial consists of short clips of interviews of some of the Doctor's female companions. Katy Manning (Jo Grant) and Sophie Aldred (Ace) are brought through time and space to testify in court. Former writers and producers such as Terrance Dicks and John Nathan-Turner are cross examined through video interviews on their part in making the show "sexist". There are no clips from Doctor Who in the video. In 2008 the BBV film Zygon: When Being You Just Isn't Enough was released. It features Zygons.

Some contributors to these independent productions in the 1990s later contributed to the television series after its return. They include writer/performers Mark Gatiss and Nicholas Briggs and novelist/modelmaker Mike Tucker.

== Audio ==
Many audio productions based upon Doctor Who have been produced over the years. The first, in 1976, was a children's audio adventure entitled Doctor Who and the Pescatons by Victor Pemberton.

In 1985, during a period when the series was on a sabbatical at the BBC, BBC Radio hired Colin Baker and his TV companion Nicola Bryant to reprise their TV roles for a new production called Slipback.

In the 1990s, the BBC began issuing the soundtracks of serials from the 1960s on cassette and compact disc; initially these were the "lost" episodes, but have also included serials from the 1970s and 1980s. There were also two further radio dramas: The Paradise of Death (1993) and The Ghosts of N-Space (1996), both featuring Jon Pertwee, which like Slipback were first broadcast on BBC Radio.

Beginning in 1999, Big Finish Productions, under licence from the BBC, began a range of audio plays on compact disc, with one released every month. Big Finish have also produced a limited-run series of audio plays based around one of the Doctor's former television companions, Sarah Jane Smith, as well as a limited Doctor Who Unbound series that explores possibilities contrary to the established mythos (for instance, "What if the Doctor had never left Gallifrey?"). From 6 August 2005, several of the Eighth Doctor audio dramas are being broadcast on the digital radio station BBC Radio 4 Extra—these are Storm Warning, Sword of Orion, The Stones of Venice, Invaders from Mars, Shada and The Chimes of Midnight. A new series of original audio dramas featuring the Eighth Doctor and new companion Lucie Miller began airing on BBC7 on 31 December 2006. These are Blood of the Daleks, Horror of Glam Rock, Immortal Beloved, Phobos, No More Lies and Human Resources. A second series of audios featuring the Eighth Doctor and Lucie Miller were broadcast on BBC7 in 2009, having first been released on CD by Big Finish Productions.

In 2009 and 2010, Big Finish Productions released further series of "old" material, firstly audio versions of Doctor Who stage plays from the 1960s to 1980s. This was followed by the "lost" season 23 featuring the Sixth Doctor—these were scripts originally written for the season that was cancelled before returning in the Trial of a Time Lord. The second season of Lost Stories, to be released in 2010, includes audio versions of unmade episodes featuring the First Doctor and Second Doctor, the original "Dalek" pilot made for US television, and stories originally commissioned for the cancelled season 27 featuring the Seventh Doctor.

There are also several other Doctor Who-related audio mini-series including Dalek Empire, Dalek Empire II: Dalek War, Dalek Empire III, and Dalek Empire IV: The Fearless, Cyberman, Sarah Jane Smith, Gallifrey, UNIT, the Kaldor City and Faction Paradox series. Several of these audio productions were commissioned by and broadcast by the BBC, albeit on radio (in particular Slipback, the Pertwee serials, and the more recent BBC7 McGann series).

Produced by AudioGo, a Tenth Doctor story, 'Dead Air' by James Goss, won Best Audiobook of the Year Award in 2010.

In April 2022, BBC Sounds began airing Doctor Who: Redacted, a ten-episode podcast written by Juno Dawson and starring Charlie Craggs and featuring Jodie Whittaker as the thirteenth Doctor. A second, six-episode season aired in late 2023 with Dawson once again writing the show and Craggs, Chimimba and Holly Quin-Ankrah returning. The Sarah Jane Adventures actors Alexander Armstrong and Anjli Mohindra joined the second season cast.

== Stage ==
The universe of Doctor Who has been adapted several times for the stage.

The earliest such production was The Curse of the Daleks, written by David Whitaker and Terry Nation and directed by Gillian Howell, which played at Wyndham's Theatre over the December 1965 to January 1966 Christmas theatre season. Whitaker's play was intended to link the televised serials The Daleks and Dalek Invasion of Earth and elements later appeared in the Daleks comic strip that later ran in TV21.

The Daleks also play a major role in the first produced stageplay to feature the Doctor. Doctor Who and the Daleks in the Seven Keys to Doomsday was written by Terrance Dicks and directed by Mick Hughes and ran at London's Adelphi Theatre over the 1974–75 Christmas season and was expected to tour England until April 1975. However, the tour was cancelled at the eleventh hour. Trevor Martin played an alternate version of the Fourth Doctor in this play, which takes place immediately after the Third Doctor's regeneration in Planet of the Spiders (the play was staged before Tom Baker's official debut as the Fourth Doctor in early 1975 although Baker had appeared at the close of Planet of the Spiders). The play co-starred former Doctor Who companion Wendy Padbury (playing a different character named Jenny). Also in the cast was Simon Jones as the "Master of Karn", several years before he worked with Doctor Who writer Douglas Adams on The Hitchhiker's Guide to the Galaxy. The play was not well attended by audiences as it debuted during an upswing of IRA violence in London.

UNIT was the focus of Recall UNIT (or, The Great Tea Bag Mystery), a play mounted in August 1984 at the Moray House Theatre in Edinburgh. The play was directed and co-written by Richard Franklin, who had played Mike Yates in the series, and he reprised the role for the play, along with John Levene who returned as Sergeant Benton. The Daleks once again returned, as did Nicholas Courtney whose recorded voice allowed Brigadier Alistair Lethbridge-Stewart to also take part in the play, albeit off-stage.

Doctor Who – The Ultimate Adventure was mounted at Wimbledon Theatre in London for several months starting in March 1989. This musical play paired the Doctor with a set of new companions in a battle against not only the Daleks but the Cybermen as well. Jon Pertwee initially starred in the play for the first half of its run, reprising the Third Doctor. For the second half of the run, Colin Baker starred as the Sixth Doctor. For one performance during Pertwee's tenure, David Banks (best known for playing various Cybermen in the TV series) played the Doctor when Pertwee fell ill.

From October to November 2010, Doctor Who Live toured in arenas across Britain.

In July 2011, as part of the Manchester International Festival, a live production "The Crash of the Elysium" ran in and around the new BBC developments in Media City. This was an interactive play, aimed at children, where the actors lead the audience through the set, with set-piece events occurring at various points. It featured filmed footage of the Eleventh Doctor, and weeping angels.

== Webcasts ==
A series of audio plays have also been webcast on bbc.co.uk, beginning with Death Comes to Time in 2001. The first episode had been made for, and then turned down by, BBC Radio 4 and after an experimental webcasting of this pilot generated over a million page hits, the rest of the episodes were produced and webcast. The serial featured Sylvester McCoy reprising his role as the Seventh Doctor.

Despite Death Comes to Time's award-winning success, political wrangling behind the scenes meant the next two serials made specially for webcasts were by Big Finish Productions: Real Time (2002), with the Sixth Doctor versus the Cybermen and Shada (2003), with Paul McGann as the Eighth Doctor in a script originally written by Douglas Adams and intended for the Fourth Doctor Tom Baker in 1979, but abandoned halfway through filming back then due to a BBC staff strike.

Although all of these adventures were intended as purely audio and were later released on CD, as webcasts they were accompanied by a slideshow of partially animated illustrations drawn by artist Lee Sullivan. Death Comes to Time was also released as a special MP3 CD with interactive content, including an option to view the illustrations as well as other bonus material such as cast and crew interviews that were originally available online.

In the middle of 2003, BBCi initiated plans to bring webcast production back in-house, producing the all-new adventure Scream of the Shalka by Paul Cornell, starring Richard E. Grant as the Ninth Doctor and Derek Jacobi as the Master. This differed from the previous webcasts in that it was specifically an audio-visual experience and not an audio adventure: it was fully animated to broadcast standard (although the webcast version was slightly simplified for that medium) by Cosgrove Hall Films and webcast over five weeks in November and December 2003.

The adventures were originally intended to be an official continuation of the Doctor Who mythos, and Grant was, for a brief time, touted as the New Doctor. However, with the announcement of the new BBC television series, Shalka was relegated to non-official status, and Russell T Davies, producer of the 2005 revival series, has referred to Christopher Eccleston as the Ninth Doctor. Plans for further webcasts were shelved.

== Merchandise ==
Doctor Who has generated many hundreds of products related to the show since its beginnings in the 1960s, from toys and games to picture cards and postage stamps.
