= Future boy =

Future boy(s) may refer to:

- Future Boy, alternative name of musician James Bourne
- Future Boy (song), from the 2001 album The Optimist LP by Turin Brakes
- "Future Boy" (Quantum Leap), a 1991 television episode
- Future Boy Conan, a Japanese anime series
- Future Boy Zoltron, an episode of the animated series Steven Universe
- Mirae (band), with Korean name referred as "Mirae Sonyeon", which means "Future boys"
- The Future Boys Trilogy, a science fiction drama trilogy
- Future Boy: Back to the Future and My Journey Through the Space-Time Continuum, a 2025 memoir by Michael J. Fox
