= Rags Parkland Sings the Songs of the Future =

Science fiction concert folk musical

- Poster for the 2018 premiere
- Music: Andrew R. Butler
- Lyrics: Andrew R. Butler
- Book: Andrew R. Butler
- Setting: Richmond, Virginia, 2252 and 2241
- Premiere: October 8, 2018: Ars Nova
- Productions: 2018 off-Broadway
- Awards: Lucille Lortel Award for Outstanding Musical

Rags Parkland Sings the Songs of the Future is a science fiction concert folk musical with lyrics, music, and book by Andrew R. Butler. After exhibiting an early solo iteration of the show in 2010, Butler further developed Rags Parkland which had its premiere off-Broadway in 2018 at Ars Nova, running for about a month. The premiere production starred Butler, Stacey Sargeant, Jessie Linden, Debbie Christine Tjong, Tony Jarvis, and Rick Burkhardt.

Set in the mid-2200s in a world where partially constructed and fully constructed humans face government persecution, the show begins with the title character performing solo before being joined onstage in flashback by his former band, Beaux Weathers & The Future. Butler spent nearly a decade developing a show about a folk singer performing several centuries in the future, pulling inspiration from a variety of folk, country, rock, and blues rock artists. Rags Parkland was well received by critics and garnered a combined total of 21 Drama Desk, Lucille Lortel, Drama League, and Henry Hewes award nominations, ultimately winning the Lortel Award for Outstanding Musical. An original cast recording was released in 2020 and a remount of the show was planned for the 2022–23 theater season but was later cancelled when funders left the project.

== Plot ==
In 2252, a lone folk singer named Rags Parkland performs at the Over/Under, his friend Gill's subterranean Richmond, Virginia, club ("Apocalypse in Tennessee"). Between songs, Parkland reminisces about his time during a stint in a penal colony on Mars and his romance with his former bandmate, Beaux Weathers ("Android Love Song", "Talkin' Mars Dust Blues", "Stella Charlemagne"). Parkland's songs are largely covers of songs by his old band, Beaux Weathers & The Future, and during one song ("One Hundred Years of Subterranean Society Blues"), the scene shifts back to 2241 when the full band is performing that same song at the Over/Under. Parkland, Weathers, and rest of The Future reveal a world through their performance in which partially constructed and fully constructed humans are illegal ("Never Find Us Now" through "Apple in the Sky"). All members of The Future except for Parkland are, to varying degrees, constructed, yet continue to play music underground as a way to pass along their shared history and hope.

During one song ("Love You Good"), a perimeter warning light alerts the club that a raid is taking place. In defiance of the ban on constructed humans, Weathers and the rest of The Future play on against the raid, effectively giving themselves up, while Parkland shrinks back ("The Raid"). The scene shifts forward to Parkland and Gill in 2252 once again. They reveal that Weathers and the rest of the band have not been seen since that day and Parkland indicates that he intends to keep sharing their songs and spreading their story ("Delilah in the Rubble").

== Cast and characters ==
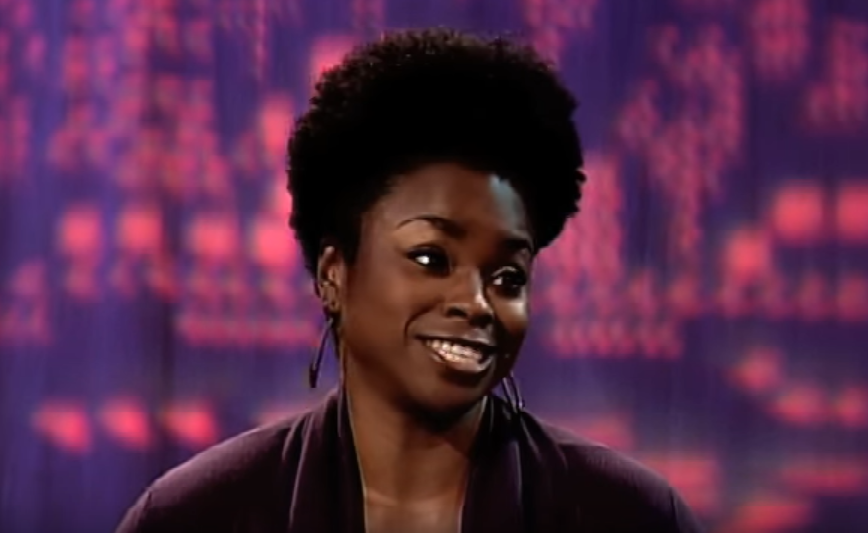
Stacey Sargeant (pictured in 2012) portrayed Beaux Weathers.

Cast and characters
Character	2018 off-Broadway
Rags Parkland	Andrew R. Butler
Beaux Weathers	Stacey Sargeant
Devo	Jessie Linden
Ess Pinvint	Debbie Christine Tjong
Gill	Tony Jarvis
Rick	Rick Burkhardt

== Songs ==
Adapted from the cast recording's liner notes.

- "Apocalypse in Tennessee" – Rags
- "Android Love Song" – Rags
- "Talkin' Mars Dust Blues" – Rags
- "Stella Charlemagne" – Rags (Note: The original cast recording lists this track as "Stella Charlemagne (Rags)". It is preceded on the album by a short spoken segment entitled "Stella Charlemagne Intro".)
- "One Hundred Years of Subterranean Society Blues" – Rags, Beaux
- "Never Find Us Now" – Beaux, Rags, Company
- "These Small Things" – Rags, Beaux
- "Surrender" – Rick
- "We Are and We Are" – Beaux, Company
- "Stella Charlemagne" – Beaux, Rags (Note: The original cast recording lists this track as "Stella Charlemagne (Beaux)".)
- "Apple in the Sky" – Beaux, Company
- "Love You Good" – Rags, Beaux
- "The Raid" – Company
- "Delilah in the Rubble" – Rags

== Writing ==
In 2009, Andrew R. Butler was reading science fiction classics when he encountered the Philip K. Dick short story "What'll We Do with Ragland Park?", whose title character was a folk singer. While Butler was not drawn to the story itself, the idea of an American folk singer performing several centuries in the future appealed to him, suggesting "a show that had the shape of a concert, but that told a much wider story." Developing this concept, he described an interest in characters in the future "thinking about history, and some of that is our present and some of that is our past, and that character can also be thinking about the future, which immediately changes our temporal framework in a way that is exciting." Butler envisioned the world of the 23rd century as one in which significant political turmoil had come as a result of climate change and resource depletion.

The combination of science fiction and folk music, known as filk, had existed as a genre for decades although Butler noted that while he was unaware of it while writing Rags Parkland, he "never imagined that nobody had done this before". When he was working on the musical he "started poking around, just trying to do some research and get [his] bearings and [he] discovered" filk. Rags Parkland was one of several off-Broadway shows produced in late 2018 to combine science fiction and folk music, others including 1969: The Second Man at New York Theatre Workshop and The Outer Space at Joe's Pub.

At first, Butler wrote songs for the Rags Parkland character, whose name alludes to the titular character of Dick's short story. He conceived the show as a solo musical based on what he was able to do as a performer, namely singing and playing guitar. Butler pulled musical influence from Odetta, Skip James, Woody Guthrie, and Bob Dylan for Parkland's character, ultimately reverse-engineering the musical's story from the songs he had written. When Butler began writing songs for the character Beaux Weathers and the band The Future, his musical influences expanded to include the more complex arrangements of Alabama Shakes, Jason Isbell, and Fleetwood Mac. Butler's collaborators composed their own instrumentations from the starting point of Butler's vocal and guitar arrangements.

== Productions ==
The first iteration of Rags Parkland was a solo performance written by and starring Butler, staged in 2010 as part of the annual ANT Fest program at the off-Broadway theater Ars Nova in Hell's Kitchen, New York. Butler further developed the show at Ars Nova, where it had its world premiere as a full-scale production. Rags Parkland was staged as a cabaret with seating on three sides in a production that was directed by Jordan Fein with set design by Laura Jellinek, lighting design by Barbara Samuels, costume design by Andy Jean, and sound design by Mikaal Sulaiman. Butler wrote the show's book, music, and lyrics, with the other castmembers credited for additional music and arrangements. Previews were scheduled to begin on September 25, 2018. The production was postponed by a week when Ars Nova was affected by water damage; Alexis Soloski speculated in The New York Times that Jellinek incorporated the damage into show's set design. Rags Parkland opened on October 8 and was scheduled to close on November 3 but was extended until November 10.

A remount of the show at the Irondale Center in Brooklyn, New York, with all members of the original off-Broadway cast except Tjong confirmed to reprise their roles was announced in December 2021. Performances were scheduled to run from March 22 through April 7, 2022, but the remount was postponed in January of that year until later in the 2022–23 theater season before being cancelled altogether when its funders exited the project.

== Reception ==
Rags Parkland was well received by critics. In The New York Times, Soloski described the show's concert musical structure and science fiction–folk music combination as unique and praised the economy and flow of Butler's writing for the way it advanced the narrative. Zachary Stewart of TheaterMania said of the cast that the "six immensely talented musicians come together to form a really spectacular band, performing Butler's catchy original songs with love and a sense of ownership" and Raven Snook in Time Out New York praised Stacey Sargeant in particular as "the show's heart and soul". Both Sarah Fitts of BroadwayWorld and Dan O'Neil of Culturebot wrote that the show left much of its worldbuilding unspoken, which both critics responded to favorably. However, O'Neil also wrote that the show's simple flashback structure did not leave much room for surprise.

== Awards and honors ==
=== Original off-Broadway production ===
The 2018 Ars Nova production of Rags Parkland was nominated for nine Drama Desk Awards, six Lucille Lortel Awards, three Henry Hayes Design Awards, and two Drama League Awards at the 2019 ceremonies, ultimately winning one Lortel Award for Outstanding Musical.

Awards and nominations for the 2018 Ars Nova production of Rags Parkland Sings the Songs of the Future
Year	Award ceremony	Category	Nominee(s)	Result
2019
2019	Lucille Lortel Awards	Outstanding Musical	Rags Parkland Sings the Songs of the Future	Won
2019	Lucille Lortel Awards	Outstanding Lead Actor in a Musical	Andrew R. Butler	Nominated
2019	Lucille Lortel Awards	Outstanding Lead Actress in a Musical	Stacey Sargeant	Nominated
2019	Lucille Lortel Awards	Outstanding Scenic Design	Laura Jellinek	Nominated
2019	Lucille Lortel Awards	Outstanding Lighting Design	Barbara Samuels	Nominated
2019	Lucille Lortel Awards	Outstanding Sound Design	Mikaal Sulaiman	Nominated
2019	Drama Desk Awards	Outstanding Musical	Rags Parkland Sings the Songs of the Future	Nominated
2019	Drama Desk Awards	Outstanding Actor in a Musical	Andrew R. Butler	Nominated
2019	Drama Desk Awards	Outstanding Actress in a Musical	Stacey Sargeant	Nominated
2019	Drama Desk Awards	Outstanding Music	Andrew R. Butler	Nominated
2019	Drama Desk Awards	Outstanding Lyrics	Andrew R. Butler	Nominated
2019	Drama Desk Awards	Outstanding Book of a Musical	Andrew R. Butler	Nominated
2019	Drama Desk Awards	Outstanding Scenic Design for a Musical	Laura Jellinek	Nominated
2019	Drama Desk Awards	Outstanding Lighting Design for a Musical	Barbara Samuels	Nominated
2019	Drama Desk Awards	Outstanding Sound Design in a Musical	Mikaal Sulaiman	Nominated
2019	Drama League Awards	Outstanding Production of a Musical	Andrew R. Butler, Jordan Fein, Ars Nova	Nominated
2019	Drama League Awards	Distinguished Performance	Stacey Sargeant	Nominated
2019	Henry Hewes Design Awards	Scenic Design	Laura Jellinek	Nominated
2019	Henry Hewes Design Awards	Lighting Design	Barbara Samuels	Nominated
2019	Henry Hewes Design Awards	Notable Effects	Mikaal Sulaiman	Nominated

== Recording ==
Rags Parkland Sings the Songs of the Future

Cast recording by Rags Parkland cast
- Released: March 27, 2020
- Genre: Folk music
- Length: 60:47
- Label: Broadway Records
- Producer: David Treatman; Tony Maimone

An original cast recording of the show, produced by David Treatman and Tony Maimone and distributed by Broadway Records, was released on March 27, 2020. The album's liner notes, by Philip Romano, were written in an in-universe style from the year 2299 with a fictional introduction presenting the tracks as recovered memory data. Reviewing for BroadwayWorld, David Clarke wrote favorably of Butler's and Sargeant's vocal performances and found the album's themes timely in the context of the ongoing physical distancing resulting from the COVID-19 pandemic. Clarke, who had not seen the stage performance of the show, found the show's conceit somewhat difficult to ascertain through the songs alone but said that the liner notes "ensure[] that everyone can understand what the musical is about and how it operates. Every detail is attended to and guarantees that every facet of the final product shimmers."
