= PopCon =

PopCon or popcon can mean:

- PopCon Indy, a popular culture convention
- Popular Conservatism, a faction of the British Conservative Party
- the Yamaha Popular Song Contest
