= James Wylder =

American author and publisher

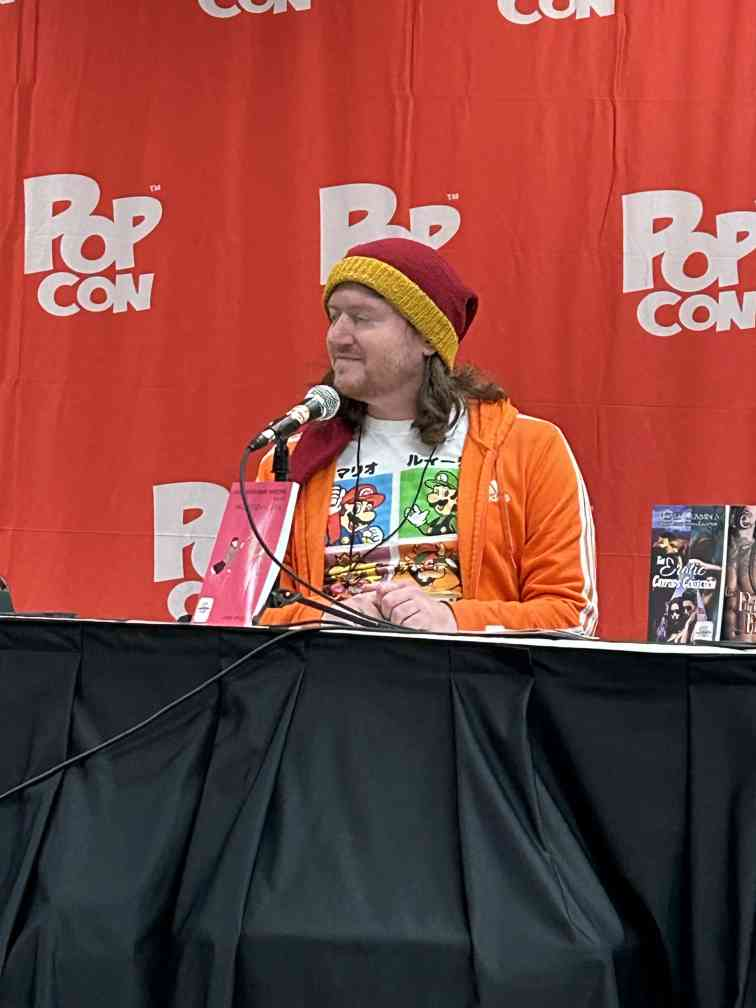
- Wylder at PopCon Indy 2024.
- Born: October 10, 1989 (age 37)
- Occupations: Author, publisher
- Writing career
- Genre: Science fiction
- Website: www.jameswylder.com

James Wylder (born October 10, 1989) is an American writer and publisher. They are best known for their work on multiple Doctor Who spin-offs and their own original series, 10,000 Dawns.

They are the founder and CEO of Arcbeatle Press.

== Early life and career ==
Wylder was interested in writing from an early age, noting that they forced their sisters to write stories that they had created before they could write. They continued this interest into college, when they would graduate Hanover College with a bachelor's degree in English and Creative Writing.

Wylder came into prominence in 2013 after announcing the publication of a Doctor Who poetry book, marking the 50th anniversary of the series, entitled An Eloquence of Time and Space. A noted Doctor Who fan since the age of three, Wylder received widespread media attention, including an article in the New York Daily News for the project. In 2013, Wylder also founded Arcbeatle Press.

For their eighth book, Wylder published 10,000 Dawns, the first full novel in the series of the same name. Although the characters had appeared in An Eloquence of Time and Space, this was broadly considered to be their mainstream debut. Wylder based the story on a tabletop roleplaying game they and their friends had participated in during college.

For the release of Death and Doubling Cubes, Wylder hired Rachel Johnson to design the cover, as well as the illustrations inside the novel. Wylder noted that the story, while set in the same universe as the previous book, did not act as a direct sequel; instead, it acted as a stand-alone story with new characters.

Wylder collaborated with multiple authors for 10,000 Dawns: Poor Man's Illiad, including Doctor Who author Simon Bucher-Jones and Star Wars Tales contributor Nathan P. Butler.

In 2019, Wylder returned to the world of Doctor Who to write a story for the novelization of Cyberon. In 2020, they contributed a story to Cwej: Down the Middle.

They are currently working on the WARSONG series, a spin-off of the WARS Trading Card Game. Much like Doctor Who, they are a longtime fan of the series and previously worked with Grail Quest Books, who had held the license before Arcbeatle Press.

== Personal life ==
Wylder is non-binary and uses they/them pronouns.
