= WARS Trading Card Game =

Collectible card game

- Cardback of WARS TCG
- Publishers: Decipher
- Players: 2
- Playing time: Approx 1 hour
- Chance: Some
- Skills: Card playing Arithmetic; Basic Reading Ability

The WARS Trading Card Game is an out-of-print trading card game released by Decipher in October 2004 with science fiction themes, using game mechanics from the Star Wars CCG. After two releases, the game was officially "placed on hiatus" in May 2005.

In 2004-2005, a number of short stories were published in the universe. Although the game continued to be on the indefinite hiatus, starting from 2010 it had received several new publications (three books and over a dozen short stories) first from Grail Quest Books, and then Arcbeatle Press.

== Development ==
It was Decipher's only card game not based on a licensed property (the phrase "proprietary science fiction property" was repeated over many news releases). It also partly aimed at a large, pre-existing target market by using game mechanics modified from the Star Wars CCG – a game itself so popular it was the #2 selling trading card game, second only to the original collectible card game Magic: The Gathering, for much of the time between its release in late 1995 and the release of the Pokémon Trading Card Game in 1998.

Its development involved people of unusual prominence: Michael Stackpole had a hand in the game's backstory and wrote the first short stories that introduced the background to the public, John Howe conceived the Quay extraterrestrial race, and physicists were consulted to improve the scientific plausibility of the game's backdrop premises (but which were never fully revealed). Immediately before its release, an entire soundtrack was also composed for the game by Kieran Yanner.

== Setting and universe ==
From Decipher's April 30, 2004, press release: "It is Earth-year 2391. Through a vast tear in the fabric of the universe, alien warriors emerge to fight an already embattled humanity. The sky is burning. The Gateless Gate has opened. The cosmic rip meanders like a burning string across the galaxy and slices through the asteroid field near the orbit of Jupiter. The great opening becomes known as, 'The Mumon Rift' ...".

Humanity has split itself into three factions: Earthers, based around a future Earth administrated by corporations; Gongens, descendants of East Asians living on Mars (renamed Gongen) following a continent-wide nuclear disaster; Mavericks, anarchists in the "Outer Rims" with penchants for cybernetic replacements. The two alien races are the Quay, a chitinous slave race with tribal tendencies and Mesoamerican- and Austronesian-styled proper nouns, and the Shi, an advanced race of floating, psychic aliens with proper nouns styled after Indo-Aryan languages.

Meanwhile, among all the races, individuals with special abilities, called "Kizen", began appearing. Thus far the Kizen are mostly used as a gameplay device, but there were originally plans to introduce an anti-Kizen conflict storyline as well as somehow tie them with wave function collapse quantum mechanics to explain connections between Shi and humans.

== History ==
Its existence was first hinted at in January 2002, shortly after Decipher revealed to the public that it was losing the Lucasfilm license for the Star Wars CCG (SWCCG). In late April 2004, the game was officially announced in a Radio Free Decipher webcast as the spiritual follow-up to SWCCG, and the game immediately attracted massive attention from the hobby industry. For instance, at its public debut at Gen Con 2005, an introductory tournament using free demo decks is still Decipher's best-attended event in its existence, numbering over 200 people. There are still open-ended issues with the cash winners from that event never getting their prizes paid out to them.

Its official name was in constant flux between April and August 2004. The game was originally called WARS: The Mumon Rip, then WARS: The Mumon Rift following a player suggestion on Decipher's old Calder forums. The game then went through a logo change and was referred to officially as The Mumon Rift WARS Trading Card Game before undergoing a final logo change the day before Gen Con 2004 and simplified to WARS Trading Card Game. It is most commonly referred to as Wars TCG without the idiosyncratic capitalization of the entire first word; or, simply as Wars and less commonly as wtcg.

The first release, Incursion, came out on October 6, 2004, and had 330 cards. The second set, Nowhere to Hide, was released on January 7, 2005, and had 167 cards. Many more releases – three more total, at least – were planned dependent on market conditions, but by April 2005 Decipher had determined that existing sales and pre-orders for set 3 did not justify continuing the game or even to justify publishing the third set.

Further planned product releases as of December 2004 were to be called Edge of a Sword (167 cards, 18-card collectible foil subset, May 2005), Motion of Mind (330+ cards, 18-card collectible foil subset, September 2005), and Eye of Insight (167 cards, 18-card collectible foil subset, January 2006).

Edge of a Sword was actually very far into its development; most cards were already written and playtested to a degree and card art were chosen and cropped for more than 3/4 of the approximately 160 cards. The final version of the playtesting files have since been available on the Internet.

Wars TCG cards contain striking original art from numerous professional freelance artists including John Howe, one of the world's best known fantasy illustrators. Another artist, Pamelina H., who is mostly known for her guitar art, also contributed artwork. The images on the cards depicted the science fiction drama unfolding as each expansion followed the planned 10 year story arc. The final version of the playtest files for the Edge of a Sword expansion has since been made publicly available at least as early as July, 2007.

== Spin-off media ==
=== WARS Roleplaying Game ===
Mongoose Publishing released the WARS Roleplaying Game in 2005, based on the card game setting.

=== Short stories ===
Originally, Decipher published a number of short stories (The War Store listed twenty two) for free to promote the trading card game, bringing on Michael A. Stackpole and John Howe to create the universe. The short stories were written by Stackpole (6), Chuck Kallenbach (6), Mark Tuttle (3), Michael O'Brien (2), Tim Ellington (2), Kyle Heuer (1), Erika Stensvaag (1) and Evan Lorentz (1).

==== Warsong ====
On the 15th anniversary of the game, in 2020, Arcbeatle Press begun to publish free short stories to mark the occasion in a series they called Warsong. Those include:

Story	Writer
Under Construction	James Wylder
The Lost Legacy of Dogman Gale	James Wylder
So Spake the Space Pope	James Wylder
A Star in Her Eye	James Wylder
Kalingkata Has a Bad Night Out	James Wylder

==== Academy 27 ====
In 2021 Arcbeatle Press launched their WARSONG: Academy 27 series. Designed as a "slice of life" spin-off, it followed character Sang Mi on a terraformed Mars in the future. The stories were posted for free online over a weekly period. The first "season" would later be collected into a print anthology titled, Academy 27: School Days: Volume 1.

Story	Writer
Academy 27	James Wylder
Junk Dog Night	James Wylder
Vanishing Twin Syndrome	Dillon O'Hara
Uphill Both Ways	Leo Ions
He Came From Another World!	James Wylder
A Mrs. Ichinose Date Night	Andrew Davis
Im-probe-able	Leo Ions
Hall Pass	Callum Phillpott
Into the Light	James Wylder
The Foods and Festivals of Old Asia	Kimberley Chiu
Go For a Punch	James Wylder
Selfie Stick	Matthew Sychantha
The Phantom	Aidan Mason
Mania and Snow	James Wylder
Lethargy and Pixels	James Wylder
A27: The Roleplaying Game	Various writers

A second season was officially announced in November of 2023. Aidan Mason confirmed his return in a blog post for Virginia Tech's Silhouette magazine, and that his story would be a sequel to The Phantom. Serialization began in July of 2024 and new stories were released in a similar weekly format.

Story	Writer
The Girl With the Cat's Eyes	James Wylder
Stage Blocking	Elizabeth Tock
Coffee, Warm	James Wylder
Key Card	Callum Phillpott
Sang Mi Investigates!	James Wylder and Molly Warton
Apple Tree Yard	James Wylder
Kindness	James Hornby
A Kendo Story	James Wylder
Shadow of the Phantom	Aidan Mason
A Wasps' Nest of Ghouls	James Wylder

==== Crossover ====
In 2023, the Academy 27 series crossed over with the Doctor Who spin-off series Cwej starring Chris Cwej, along with the independent Arcbeatle indie series 10,000 Dawns in the novella And Today, You. The crossover was made possible by the fact that Arcbeatle Press had the licensing rights to WARS and Cwej. It acted as a 10th anniversary special for the company and a teaser for the upcoming second "season" of Academy 27.

=== Novels ===
In 2010, company Grail Quest Books received the license to publish books based on the series under the umbrella title WARS: The Battle of Phobos. Originally, three were supposed to be published, but only two would end up being put out before the series was cancelled.

Book	Writer(s)
WARS: The Battle of Phobos - Preludes	Nathan P. Butler, Sean E. Williams, Jim Perry
WARS: The Battle of Phobos - Stretti	Sabrina Fried, Nathan P. Butler, Jim Perry

The license was eventually reverted to Arcbeatle Press, who began to publish their own novels under the WARSONG logo. This was inspired by president and owner James Wylder, who is a noted fan of the series and worked with Grail Quest when they had the license.

Arcbeatle's first book was originally supposed to be published in 2021. However, due to the COVID-19 pandemic, it was delayed. Post COVID, the company would re-release the first two novels published by Grail Quest under the WARSONG line, before publishing the final intended book of the saga in 2023.

Book	Writer(s)
WARSONG: Preludes: The Battle of Phobos Book 1	Nathan P. Butler, Sean E. Williams, Jim Perry
WARSONG: Stretti: The Battle of Phobos 2	Sabrina Fried, Nathan P. Butler, Jim Perry
WARSONG: Codettas: The Battle of Phobos Book 3	James Wylder, Bryan Schmidt, Sabrina Fried, Michael Robertson,
