= Henri van Zanten =

Dutch artist (1957–2020)

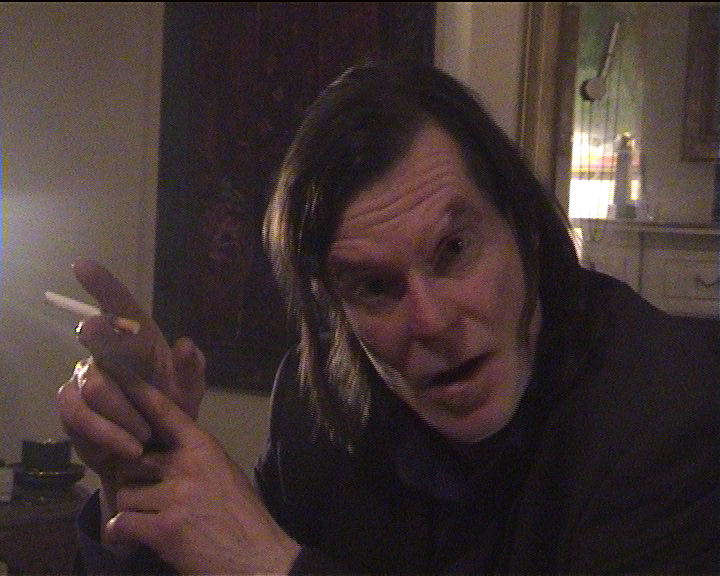
- Henri van Zanten (2003)
- Born: Henri Carel van Zanten; 18 March 1957; Rotterdam
- Died: 22 May 2020 (aged 63); Berlin

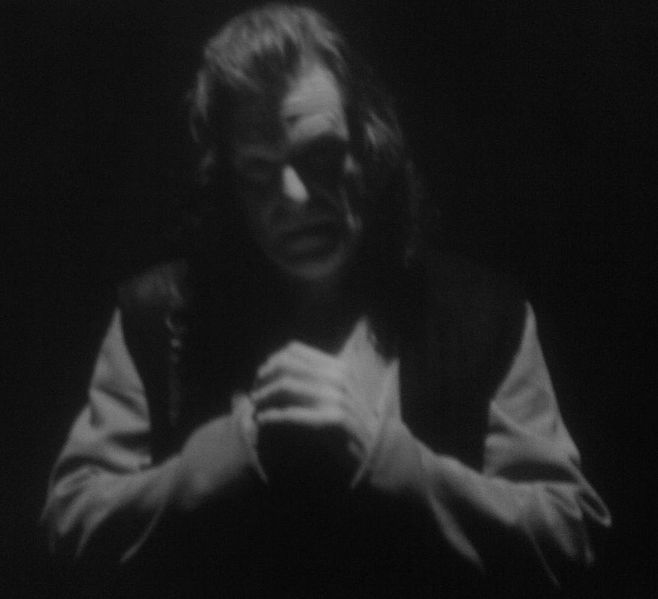
As the Master of the Scream in ’u’ (2010)

Henri Carel van Zanten (18 March 1957 – 22 May 2020) was a Dutch artist, based in Rotterdam.

== Early life and education ==
Van Zanten was born in Rotterdam, but spent a large part of his youth in Canada and South Africa. Because of that he could easily adapt to new environments and languages.

He studied Slavic linguistics under professor Karel van het Reve.

== Career ==
Van Zanten was introduced to the Stanislavski method by Piet Eelvelt. His mentor was the Belgian theatre reformer Jan Decorte. Van Zanten was active from 1982 as an artist, actor and director. Because of the many art disciplines he engaged himself in (such as theatre, performance art, street theatre, independent television production, sketch comedy, stand up comedy, acting and directing) he called himself an "omni artist".

He appeared as the Master of the Scream (narrator) in ’u’, the first Klingon opera.

He died in Berlin.
