= ʼuʼ =

2010 opera by Eef van Breen in Klingon language

- Science fiction opera by Eef van Breen
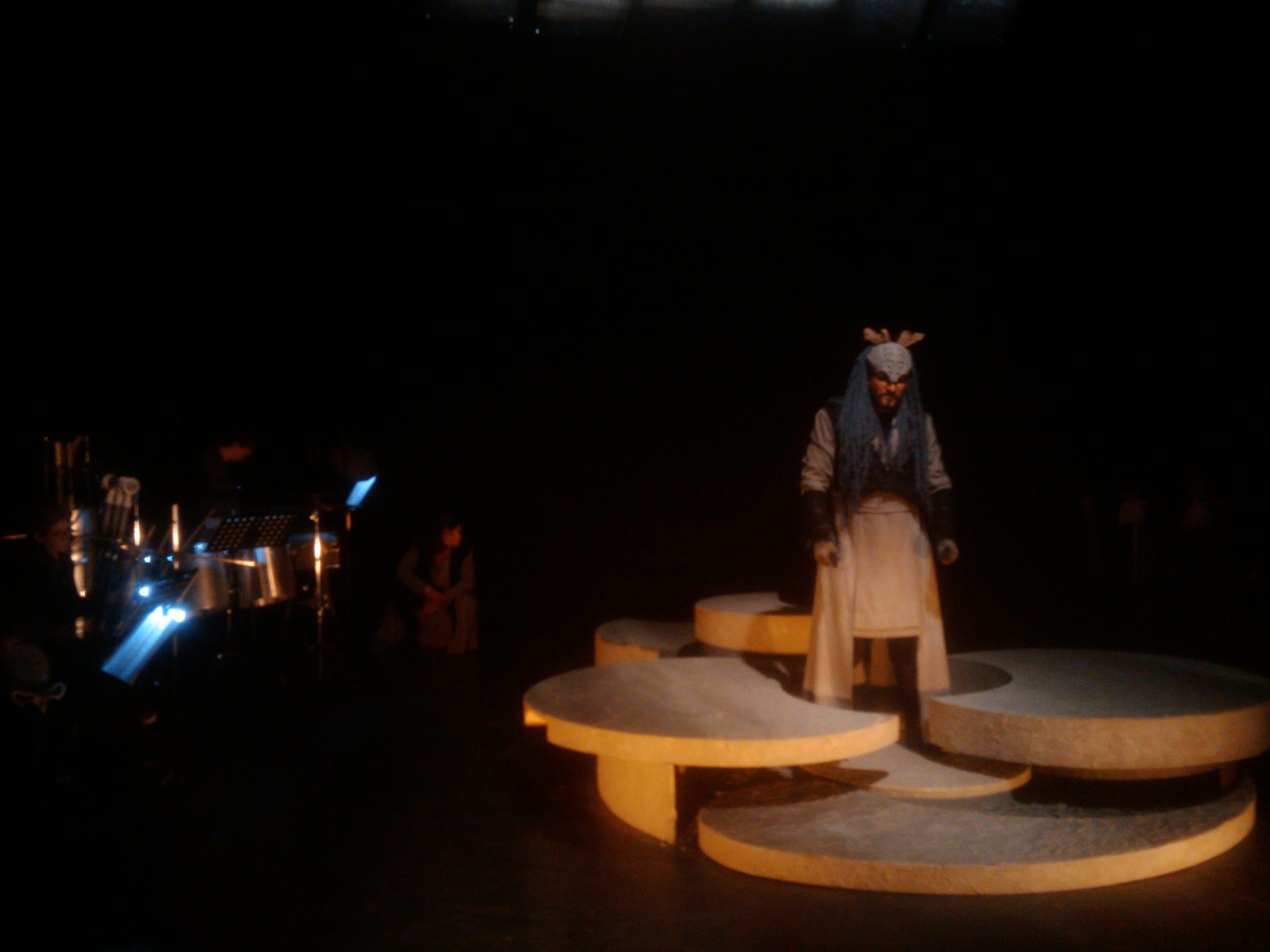
- Scene from the premiere of ʼuʼ, 10 September 2010 performed at the Zeebelt Theater in The Hague.
- Librettist: Kees Ligtelijn, Marc Okrand
- Language: Klingon
- Based on: Star Trek
- Premiere: 10 September 2010; The Hague, Netherlands

ʼuʼ ([ʔuʔ], beginning and ending with a glottal stop) is the first opera in the Klingon language, billed as "The first authentic Klingon opera on Earth". It was composed by Eef van Breen to a libretto by Kees Ligtelijn and Marc Okrand under the artistic direction of Floris Schönfeld. The story of ʼuʼ is based on the epic legend of "Kahless the Unforgettable", a messianic figure in the history of the fictional Klingon species.

The premiere of the opera in The Hague on 10 September 2010 was a success, and the opera has been revived since then.

== Background ==
The Klingon language was first conceived by actor James Doohan, who played Montgomery Scott ("Scotty") in the original Star Trek television series, for Star Trek: The Motion Picture (1979). He created some harsh-sounding words to be spoken by Klingon characters. The producers hired linguist Marc Okrand for the sequels to expand this into a full-fledged language with its own unique vocabulary, grammar, and idioms. Okrand designed the language to sound "alien", using a number of typologically uncommon features. As Klingon characters became more important in later Star Trek films and television series, Okrand continued to expand the language, and it has become a spoken language with a number of fluent speakers.

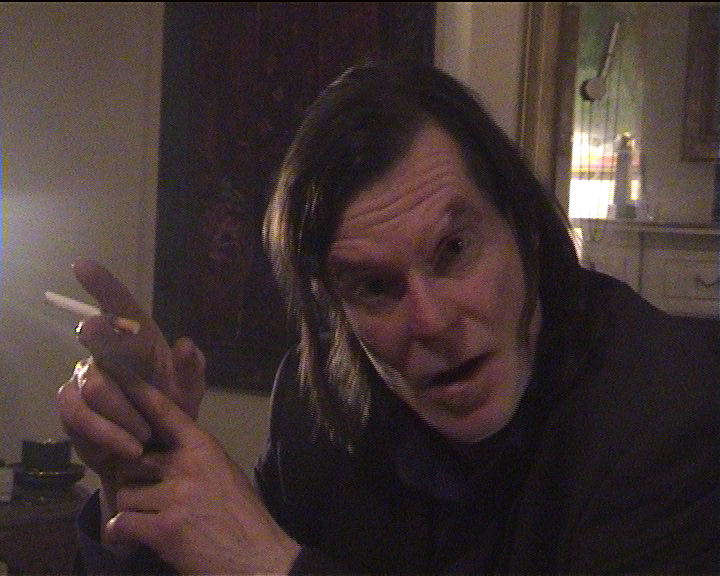
Henri van Zanten, the Master of the Scream

As depicted in Star Trek, the Klingons are passionate opera lovers. According to the official webpage for the opera, "Klingon opera uses the principle of musical combat. Beauty in Klingon music comes from the impact of two opposing forces." ʼuʼ is translated to English as "universe" or "universal".

The opera was workshopped beginning 2008 in Europe and at the Watermill Center for the Performing Arts in Water Mill, New York. Artistic and stage director and "head researcher" of the ʼuʼ project and the Klingon Terran Research Ensemble (KTRE), Floris Schönfeld, carefully researched all mentions and examples of Klingon opera in the various incarnations of Star Trek in order to make the opera as "authentic" as possible in following the conventions of Klingon battle opera. He created an "ancient treatise" called the paqʼjachchuʼ, or "book of the perfect scream", as a "theory manuscript of Klingon music". KTRE crafted "indigenous" Klingon musical instruments, including percussion, wind and strings, designed by Xavier van Wersch, to accompany the opera.

Publicity for ʼuʼ included lectures and performances by Schönfeld and KTRE at SF conventions and elsewhere. On 18 April 2010, Okrand, on behalf of the KTRE, broadcast a message from the CAMRAS radio telescope to the hypothetical co-ordinates of QoʼnoS, the Klingon home planet, in the Arcturus solar system. The message, in the Klingon language, invited the Klingons to attend the opera, although the message presumably did not reach the planet in time for the performance, since QoʼnoS is 36 light years from Earth.

== Productions and reaction ==
The opera had its official debut at the Zeebelt Theater in The Hague, Netherlands, on 10 September 2010 (following a preview the day before) for a four-performance limited run. The Dutch artist Henri van Zanten narrated the opera as the Master of the Scream. The opera was produced by Zeebelt and KTRE, which is associated with the ArtScience department of the Royal Conservatory in The Hague.

Audience reaction after the preview was enthusiastic, and the opening night, which was attended by Marc Okrand, sold out. The director of the Byrd Hoffman Watermill Foundation commented, "I found the result quite fascinating and interesting and strange and weird." The opera was repeated later in September 2010 at the Star Trek fanclub meeting Qetlop in Farnsberg, near Bad Brückenau, Germany, "for an all-Klingon audience". It was performed again on 23 and 24 November at the Frascati Theater in Amsterdam. In 2011 the opera was performed at the Voi-Z opera festival in Zwolle on 5 April and at the Huygens Music Festival in Leidschendam on 28 May.

Performances of ʼuʼ were held in the Zeebelt Theatre in The Hague on 17 February 2012 and in Rijeka, Croatia, on 25 February 2012. The opera was performed in Berlin on 22 February 2013.

== Synopsis ==
Kahless, founder of the Klingon Empire

=== Act 1 – yav ===
While hunting with his brother Morath, Kahless expresses anger when Morath causes him to miss his prey. Kahless vows to avenge this humiliation. The tyrant Molor offers to elevate Morath to the head of his house if he betrays his and Kahless's father. Morath accepts. With Molor's men, Morath enters his father's house, seizes his sword and demands that his father surrender the house. When his father refuses, Morath brutally slays his father. Kahless vows to restore their father's honor. He pursues Morath to the Kri'stak volcano. After the brothers fight, Morath throws himself into the volcano. Kahless forges the first bat'leth (or "Sword of Honor") in the volcano, from his own hair.

=== Act 2 – raD ===
The sorrowful Kahless makes an epic journey to the underworld. There he is united with his father and forgives his brother. He shows them the mok'bara, enabling them to regain their bodies. Kortar, the guardian of the underworld, is enraged to find two of his souls missing. Kahless raises troops for a rebellion against Molor. He meets his true love, the Lady Lukara, who assists him when he is attacked by Molor's men. Together, they defeat Molor's men and make violent love in the blood of their enemies.

=== Act 3 – QIH ===
At the river, the armies have assembled. Kahless inspires his troops with a rousing speech. Kortar arrives and is also stirred by Kahless's honorable motives. He agrees to join the fight and to create a heaven for the Klingon warriors. Kahless, his father and brother fight together against their enemies. The latter two are honorably killed, and Kahless's death scream sends them to heaven. Kahless faces Molor and kills him, cuts out his heart and cleans it in the river to restore Molor's honor. With the Lady Lukara's help, Kahless commits ritual suicide; Lukara's death scream sends him to join his father and brother. The Klingon people are united.

== Roles and original cast ==
- Master of the Scream (narrator) – Henri van Zanten
- Kahless (contralto) – Taru Huotari
- Kotar, Father and Molor (baritone) – Ben Kropp
- Morath and Lukara (mezzo-soprano) – Jeannette Huizinga
