= WARS Roleplaying Game =

Role-playing game

The WARS Roleplaying Game is a role-playing game published by Mongoose Publishing in 2005.

== Description ==
The WARS Roleplaying Game is a d20 System game based on the WARS Trading Card Game.

== Publication history ==
Shannon Appelcline in his book Designers & Dragons noted that d20 System publication was slowing down by 2003 so publishers moved to standalone role-playing games which relied on the Open Game License rather than supplements requiring the core rulebooks of Dungeons & Dragons or the d20 trademark license, and that Mongoose Publishing was "As usual [...] in the lead on this trend. Beginning in 2003, they put out six games that did not use the d20 trademark but which used familiar d20 systems available via the OGL", including the WARS Roleplaying Game in 2005. Applecline noted that some of these lines did well, while others "did not fair as well due to the newfound weakness of d20" and that its supplement WARS: Soul and Steel "never saw print; it was instead run in Signs & Portents from issue #39 (December, 2006) to #51 (December, 2007).
