= Cyberon =

2000 film by Bill Baggs

- Directed by: Bill Baggs
- Written by: Lance Parkin
- Produced by: Bill Baggs
- Cinematography: Richard Hookings
- Edited by: Alistair Lock
- Music by: Alistair Lock
- Distributed by: BBV
- Release date: 2000
- Running time: 61 minutes
- Language: English

Cyberon is a direct-to-video unofficial spin-off of the long-running British science fiction television series Doctor Who. It was released direct-to-DVD and produced by the independent production company BBV. It featured the Cyberons, a species created to resemble popular Doctor Who monsters, the Cybermen. The main character of the film, Lauren Anderson, later featured in Zygon: When Being You Just Isn't Enough. Originally released on VHS, the film was not widely available on video. The story was released on DVD from online retailer Galaxy 4 in 2012.

== Synopsis ==
Cyberon is the new experimental drug touted to heal Lauren Anderson's brain damaged patients. Dr. Tom Mordley tells her the drug will revolutionise medical science, but Cyberon has plans of its own.

== Cast ==
- Keith Bell - Cyberon
- Jo Castleton - Lauren Anderson
- Nancy Allen - Karen
- P.J. Ochlan - Tom Mordley
- Oliver Bradshaw - George Cooper
- David Roeciffe - Ray
- Camilla Ochlan - Denise

== Novelisation ==
Cyberon
- Author: James Hornby
- Cover artist: Callum and Stuart Brown, Warren Lewis
- Publisher: Arcbeatle Press
- Publication date: 21 September 2020
- Pages: 300
- ISBN: 979-8-688-45856-5

A novelisation of the film by James Hornby was published 21 September 2020 by Arcbeatle Press. The adapted novelisation also contained extra short stories featuring concepts and characters from Doctor Who related series such as P.R.O.B.E., the Virgin Missing Adventures, the Past Doctor Adventures and the Erimem series. An unabridged audiobook read by Nigel Peever was released for download in November 2021.

Title	Plot	Featuring	Author
"Flight of the Cyberons"	A group of Cyberons attempt to escape the clutches of the Earth Alliance to propagate their race.	Cyberons	James Hornby
"Cyberon"	The Cyberons try to spread their influence via an experimental new drug.	Lauren Anderson, Cyberons	James Hornby
"The Last Dose"	Louise Bayliss is called back to P.R.O.B.E. to deal with the fallout of Cyberon.	Louise Bayliss	James Hornby
"Silver-Tongued Liars"	Teenager Brittany Mordely finds a single leftover vial of Cyberon.	Patricia Haggard	James Wylder
"A Worthy Successor"	Giles of P.R.O.B.E. visits the Vault in Northumberland to investigate the coverup of several deaths.	Preternatural Research Bureau	James Hornby and James Wylder
"Barnyard of the Cyberons"	In the far future, the human race finds a new use for the drug known as Cyberon.	Chris Cwej	Tyche McPhee Letts
