= Stephen Jordan (writer) =

Stephen Jordan is an English science fiction, fantasy, horror and comedy writer, playwright and director.

== Career ==
In 2012, Jordan debuted his first solo production, a science fiction comedy play called 'Dead Static', about two strangers who have an hour to live in deep space. The production played to sold-out audiences and was well received. In 2013, Jordan debuted 'Pilgrim Shadow' at the Tristan Bates Theatre, sequel to Dead Static. A sequel to 'Pilgrim Shadow', called 'King Chaos', debuted in 2015, completing The Future Boys Trilogy.

His humorous fantasy short story 'The Good Death Guide' won a 2014 Watty Award, presented by online writing community Wattpad. He has also contributed short stories to Paul Finch's Terror Tales series, appearing in an anthology that was nominated for a British Fantasy award in 2015. In 2017, he successfully crowd-funded via Kickstarter the live recording and digital distribution of an audio sitcom, 'The Future Boys', based on the eponymous heroes from The Future Boys Trilogy. In 2018, he wrote a Doctor Who story for Big Finish Productions.
