= PopCon Indy =

Annual pop culture convention in Indianapolis, Indiana, US

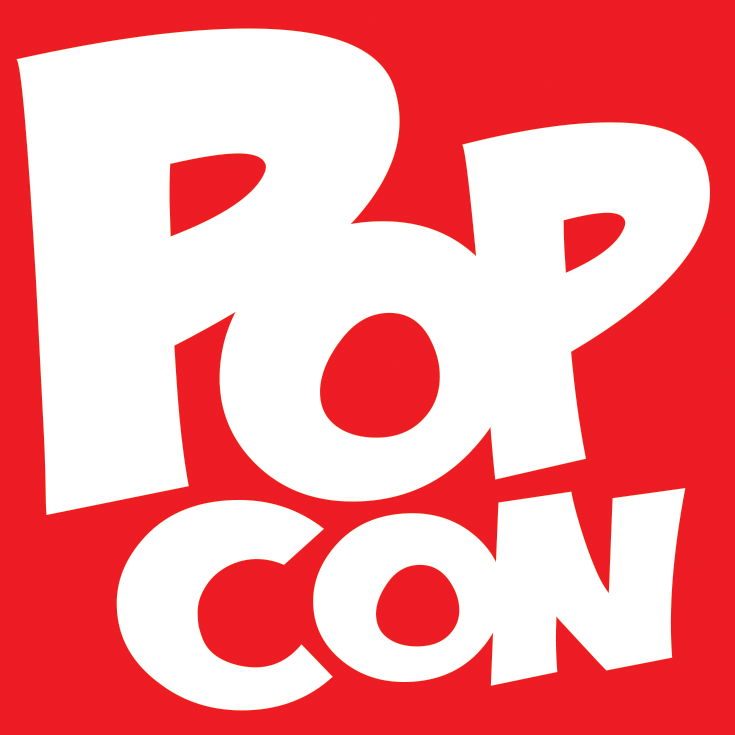
- Status: Active
- Genre: Multi-genre
- Venue: Indiana Convention Center (main); Downtown Indianapolis (various)
- Locations: Indianapolis, Indiana
- Country: United States
- Inaugurated: May 30, 2014
- Organizer: Pop Con, LLC
- Website: popcon.us

PopCon Indy (formerly known as Indy PopCon) is a pop culture convention that has been held at the Indiana Convention Center since 2014.

PopCon Indy came to public recognition on November 18, 2013, when they launched a campaign on Kickstarter with an initial funding goal of $12,000. Funding was successful, with $16,584 being raised by 135 backers. The inaugural PopCon Indy was held on May 30 – June 1, 2014, and had an attendance of 9,000. Indy PopCon 2016 was held on June 17–19 and had an attendance record of 30,000.

In 2020 PopCon Indy was held virtually due to the COVID-19 pandemic.

== Guest lineups ==
- 2014: Raychul Moore, Nicholas Brendon, John DiMaggio, Joel Hodgson, Sylvester McCoy, Paul and Storm
- 2015: Sophie Aldred, Troy Baker, Anna Faith, John de Lancie, Lloyd Kaufman, Lauren Landa, Edward James Olmos, Peter Spellos, Sarah Anne Williams, Markiplier, Jacksepticeye
- 2016: 501st Legion, Jon Bailey, Steve Cardenas, David Eddings, Sam Ellis, Jennifer Hale, Kyle Hebert, Lloyd Kaufman, Charles Martinet, Elizabeth Maxwell, Nolan North, Andy Price, Scott Ramsoomair, Malcolm Ray, Kevin Smith, StevRayBro, Tara Strong, Meg Turney, Mark Waid, Rob Walker
- 2017: Troy Baker, Johnny Yong Bosch, Charlet Chung, Jonny Cruz, Sam Ellis, Caitlin Glass, Greg Grunberg, Jess Harnell, Haiden Hazard, Richard Horvitz, Lloyd Kaufman, Phil LaMarr, Michelle "Mogchelle" Mussoni, ProJared, Nicki Taylor, Garrett Wang, Timothy Zahn
- 2018: Nick Bradshaw, LeVar Burton, Jason Faunt, Tony Fleecs, Elizabeth Henstridge, Brittney Karbowski, Pom Klementieff, Michelle "Mogchelle" Mussoni, Kristian Nairn, Lucie Pohl, Andy Price, Carolina Ravassa, Sara Richard, Jim Steranko, Ben Templesmith, Chris Uminga, Wil Wheaton, David Yost, Chrissie Zullo
- 2019: Ani-Mia, Anjali Bhimani, Jason David Frank, Richard Horvitz, Phil LaMarr, Howard Mackie, Vanessa Marshall, Brandon McInnis, Monica Rial, Alex Saviuk, John Wesley Shipp, David Sobolov, Fred Tatasciore, J. Michael Tatum, Mark Texeira, Doug Walker
- 2021: Caleb Hyles, Arlo, Jim O'Heir, Jason Faunt, Erin Cahill, Michael Copon, Arryn Zech , Kara Eberle, Jason Liebrecht, Elizabeth Maxwell
- 2022: Tom Arnold, Ian Bohen, François Chau, Jason Douglas, Barbara Dunkelman, Kara Eberle, Lindsay Jones, Brittney Karbowski, Trina Nishimura, Ian Sinclair, Roger Craig Smith, Samantha Smith, Alyson Tabbitha, Christopher Wehkamp, Arryn Zech
- 2023: Felecia Angelle, Bryn Apprill, Tia Ballard, Dawn M. Bennett, Rodger Bumpass, Chris Cason, Ming Chen, Doug Cockle, Amber Lee Connors, Michael Copon, Tracy Lynn Cruz, Kara Edwards, Jason Faunt, Maile Flanagan, Caitlin Glass, Sean Gunn, Ryan Hurst, James Marsters, Daman Mills, Chris Patton, Kyle Phillips, Kaitlyn Robrock, Michelle Rojas, Michael Rooker, Sonny Strait, Kent Williams, Stephanie Young
- 2024: John Barrowman, Dante Basco, Johnny Yong Bosch, Dani Chambers, Roger Clark, Kayla Compton, Jim Cummings, R. Bruce Elliott, Todd Haberkorn, Colton Haynes, David Hayter, Kyle Hebert, Katelyn Nacon, Danielle Nicolet, Chandler Riggs, Andy Serkis, John Swasey, Rob Wiethoff, Elijah Wood, James Wylder, Barry Yandell
- 2025: Utkarsh Ambudkar, Daniel Baugh, JB Blanc, Reba Buhr, George Buza, Pete Capella, Emma Caulfield, Cam Clarke, Townsend Coleman, Debi Derryberry, Aaron Dismuke, Cal Dodd, Barry Gordon, John Gremillion, Jason Griffith, Todd Haberkorn, Erika Harlacher, Renae Jacobs, Maurice LaMarche, Mela Lee, Madison Lintz, Ross Marquand, Landon McDonald, Brent Mukai, Reagan Murdock, Nolan North, Rob Paulsen, Aaron Roberts, Nicolas Roye, Stuart Sayger, Jason Spisak, Chris Tergliafera, Austin Tindle, Alexis Tipton, Eric Vale, Titus Welliver, Sarah Widenheft, Mick Wingert
- 2026: Sean Astin, Diedrich Bader, Dee Bradley Baker, Linda Ballantyne, Erik Braa, Christine Marie Cabanos, Clifford Chapin, Leah Clark, Caitlin Glass, Jesse James Grelle, Katie Griffin, Walter E. Jones, Mara Junot, Gabe Kunda, Lauren Landa, Alan Lee, David Matranga, Joel McDonald, Kristen McGuire, Monica Rial, Matthew David Rudd, Stuart Sayger, Keith Silverstein, Gavin Smith, Patrick Warburton, Billy West

== See also ==
- List of multigenre conventions
- List of attractions and events in Indianapolis
