= Doctor Who: TARDIS Crew =

- Based on: Doctor Who by: Sydney Newman; C. E. Webber; Donald Wilson
- Directed by: Dominic Minns
- Country of origin: United Kingdom
- Original language: English

Production
- Running time: 11 minutes
- Production companies: Blue Zoo Animation Studio; Brighton Zoo Studios

Original release
- Network: CBeebies

Related
- Doctor Who; Whoniverse

Doctor Who: TARDIS Crew is an upcoming British animated children's television series, based on the science fiction drama programme Doctor Who. The series was created for CBeebies as part of the Doctor Who franchise, known as the Whoniverse.

Produced and animated by Blue Zoo Animation Studio and directed by Dominic Minns, the 52-episode series is expected to premiere in late 2027.

== Premise ==
Doctor Who: TARDIS Crew follows the Doctor, a young Time Lord, as he travels in his time travelling machine called the TARDIS with his friends Hannah, Beastie, and Toast-IE. They encounter several new worlds as well as villains like the Daleks.

== Production ==
Doctor Who: TARDIS Crew follows the Doctor, Hannah, Beastie, and Toast-IE.

In June 2025, the BBC announced it was seeking a production company to work on an animated spin-off of Doctor Who for preschool audiences to air on CBeebies. In December 2025, the contract for production was awarded to Blue Zoo Animation Studio, with 52 episodes to be split across two series. Subsidiary company Brighton Zoo will also work on the series, which entered production in August 2026, directed by Dominic Minns. BBC Children's and Education revealed the programme's title and art design on 6 October 2026.

== Release ==
Doctor Who: TARDIS Crew is set to premiere in late 2027. The 11-minute episodes are expected to air in two parts: the first 26 episodes from 2027–2028, and the remaining 26 from 2028–2029.
