= Eef van Breen =

Dutch jazz trumpeter, singer, arranger and composer

Eef van Breen (born 3 January 1978) is a Dutch jazz trumpeter, singer, arranger and composer.

Eef van Breen was born in Westerbork in the Dutch province of Drenthe. In 2010, van Breen wrote the music for ʼuʼ, the first opera in the Klingon language. His debut album Playing Games (2010, Challenge Jazz) obtained an Edison nomination.

== Discography ==
- Playing Games (Challenge, 2010)
- Changing Scenes (Challenge, 2011)
