= The Future Boys Trilogy =

The Future Boys are Tyler Smith and Gary Patches, the lead characters from Steve Jordan's science fiction comedy plays Dead Static, Pilgrim Shadow and King Chaos. The plays make up a theatre series known as The Future Boys Trilogy, The plays are produced by Bad Bat Productions (previously ManMoth Productions), and star Cliff Chapman as Tyler and Adam Joselyn as Gary.

== Audio Series ==
In 2016, writer and director Steve Jordan revealed that the team would be crowd-funding a pilot for a new audio series based on the Future Boys. In 2017, the live recording and digital release of 2 episodes of 'The Future Boys', a new audio sitcom, was successfully crowd-funded on Kickstarter. The episodes were released as a free download on iTunes in June 2017.

== Fiction ==
In 2018, a novella entitled 'Empire of Monsters' was released featuring Tyler and Gary as secondary characters, set within their universe. In 2019, an eponymous novel was released telling the entire Future Boys saga, including the stories of the original plays. A sequel, In Space No One Cares, was released in 2025.
