= Doctor Who Live =

Stage show based on the television series Doctor Who

Doctor Who Live: The Monsters Are Coming!
- Official Poster used to promote Doctor Who Live.
- Original language: English
- Genre: Science fiction

Premiere
- Date: 8 October 2010
- Place: Wembley Arena; London, England

Doctor Who Live: The Monsters Are Coming! is an arena stage show based on the BBC TV programme Doctor Who. The show depicts a travelling showman named Vorgenson, portrayed by actor Nigel Planer, attempting to lure the Doctor to Vorgenson's travelling show by summoning monsters from throughout space and time using a device known as the Minimiser. The production premiered on 8 October 2010 in Wembley Arena and toured for the following few months.

The show was conceived after the success of the 2008 Doctor Who Prom, with stage show veteran Will Brenton brought on to help with production. The show is a sequel to the 1973 serial Carnival of Monsters, with Vorgenson being the son of a character from the serial, and several elements of the show being taken from it. The show also features many elements from the series, including monsters such as the Daleks, Cybermen, and Weeping Angels. Matt Smith appears as the Eleventh Doctor via pre-filmed segments due to scheduling conflicts with the ongoing filming of the main series at the time of the show's touring.

The show received largely positive reviews for its performances, music, and appearances by the various monsters, but received minor criticism for aspects of its execution, such as its more childish tone compared to the main series.

== Plot ==
Vorgenson, a travelling showman and a fan of The Doctor, has set up his travelling stage show. Vorgenson has a device known as the Minimiser, which is capable of summoning beings from throughout time and space that are trapped within the Minimiser. Vorgenson uses it in an attempt to attract the Doctor's attention.

After showing off the different monsters he has captured, Vorgenson pulls Winston Churchill from World War II, causing a paradox and threatening the present. Churchill contacts the Eleventh Doctor, who arrives to help him. Churchill is sent back to the Minimiser, and Vorgenson summons Judoon to track down the Doctor in case he has already arrived. The Judoon nearly turn on Vorgenson, requiring Vorgenson to trick them back into the Minimiser. The Doctor contacts the real world audience watching the show and attempts to have them help him summon his time machine, the TARDIS, to him, but is interrupted by Weeping Angels emerging from the Minimiser. The Angels send police officers who have come to investigate the show back in time; Vorgenson is able to send the Angels back into the Minimiser. The Doctor threatens Vorgenson to shut down the Minimiser, but Vorgenson manages to trap the Doctor inside of the device. The Doctor warns Vorgenson that someone is behind the events of the show as Vorgenson leaves, ending the show's first act.

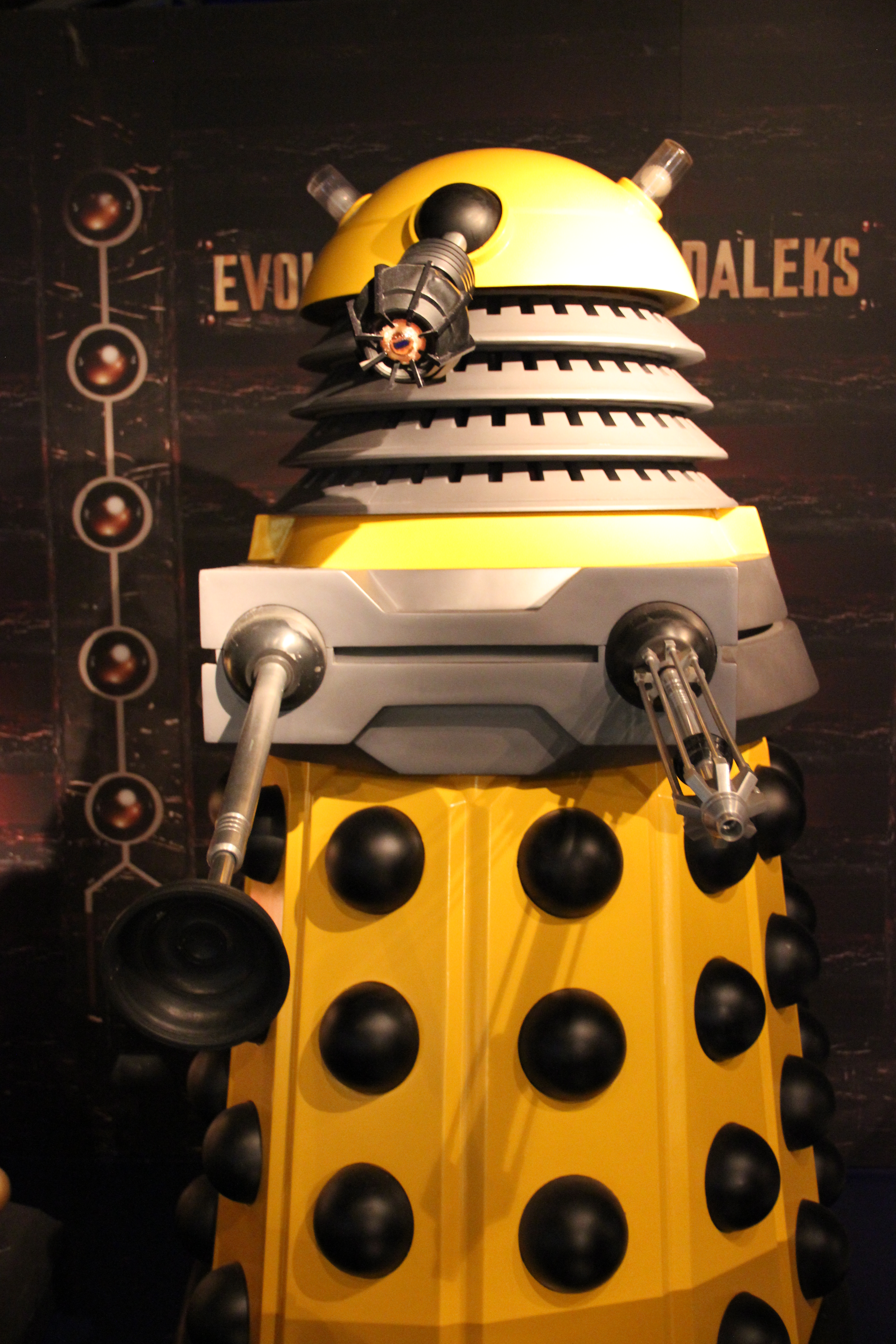
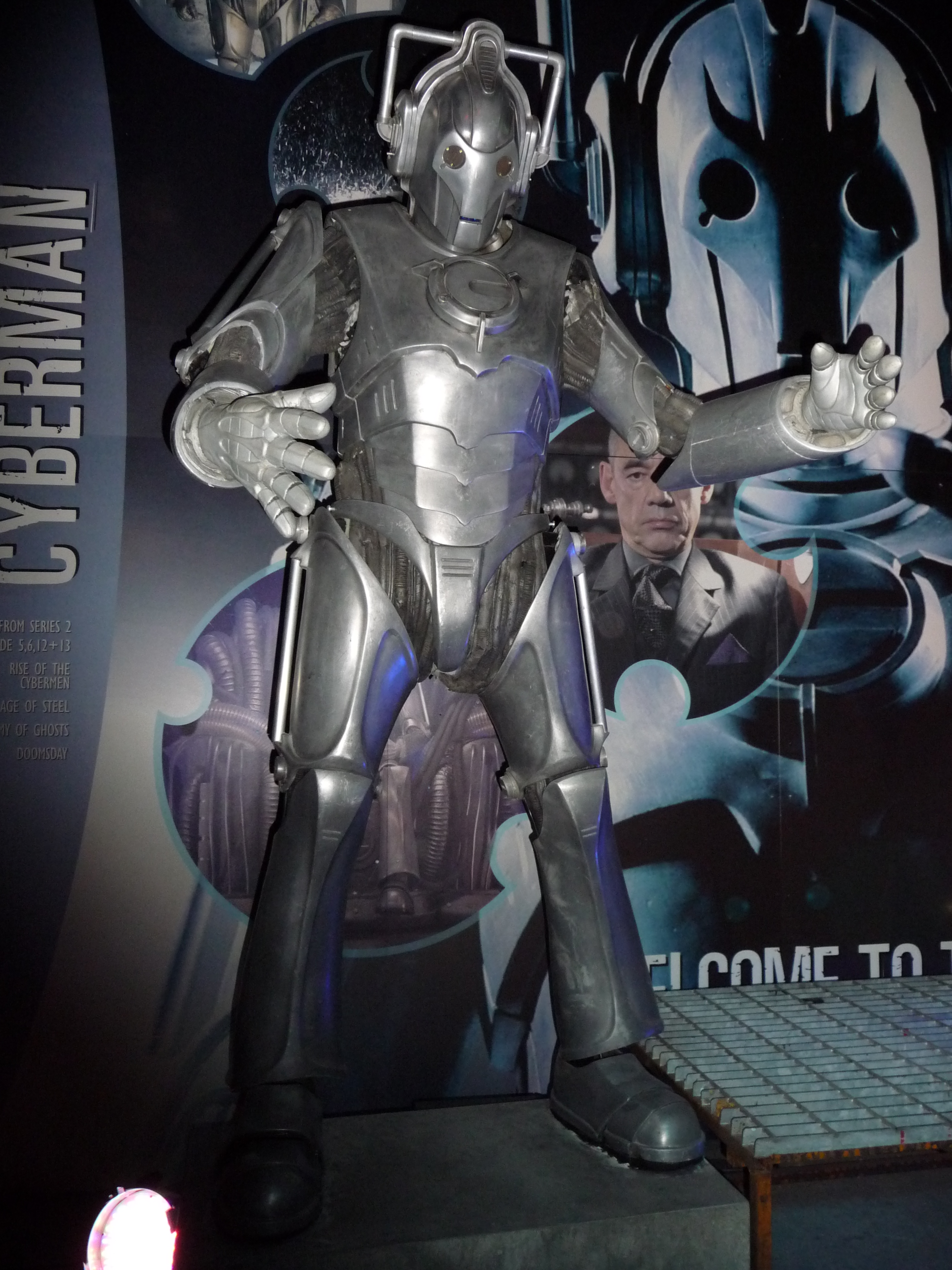
Daleks (left) and Cybermen (right) are some of the monsters that appear in the production

Following a performance by Scarecrows between the acts, the second act starts with the Cybermen being released into the audience. The Daleks appear, and they reveal that they were the ones who gave Vorgenson the concept for the Minimiser by projecting the ideas into his dreams. They capture the Doctor and imprison him inside of a box on the stage. The Doctor releases the Cybermen from the Minimiser, and they fight the Daleks. Though the Daleks initially have the upper hand, the Cybermen use upgraded technology to overpower the Daleks. The Daleks retreat into the Minimiser. Vorgenson apologizes to the Doctor for his actions, and the Doctor reveals he returned everyone trapped in the Minimiser back to their respective homes, barring the Daleks, who remain trapped. A single Dalek appears and threatens the Doctor, but the arrival of the TARDIS overpowers the Dalek and sends it away. The Doctor leaves in the TARDIS.

== Conception and development ==
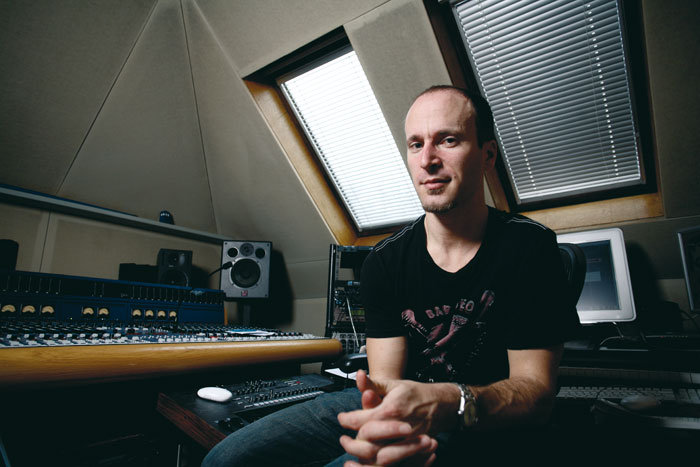
Murray Gold (pictured) composed the music used in the show

Stage productions had previously been performed using the Doctor Who brand, such as 1974's Seven Keys to Doomsday. After the success of the first Doctor Who Prom, a concert held by the BBC, BBC Worldwide decided to develop a live Doctor Who concert tour. Around Christmas 2009, BBC Worldwide approached Will Brenton, creator of puppet children's television series Tweenies, to direct the show. Brenton, who had experience with large arena-based shows, decided that the performance would need more narrative thrust and live engagement with the audience. In discussions with Doctor Who executive producer Steven Moffat, Brenton proposed a "Jurassic Park kind of feel" with a character bringing in others for show; Moffat suggested that the show could follow on from elements of the 1973 Doctor Who television serial Carnival of Monsters, which featured an interstellar showman who kept different monsters miniaturised for entertainment. Moffat had desired a show like Live since he was a child, and thus helped spearhead the production. Doctor Who writer Gareth Roberts was brought on to co-write the show's script with Brenton. Gary and Paul Hardy-Brown, also known as the Twins, helped with constructing the final encounter between the lone Dalek and the TARDIS, with their techniques being used to make it appear as though the Dalek was flying without the use of wires. The pair additionally helped with a scene where a man is turned into a Cyberman live on stage. Ben Foster, who orchestrates Murray Gold's compositions for the television programme, developed the musical component of the show, and conducts the 16-piece band.

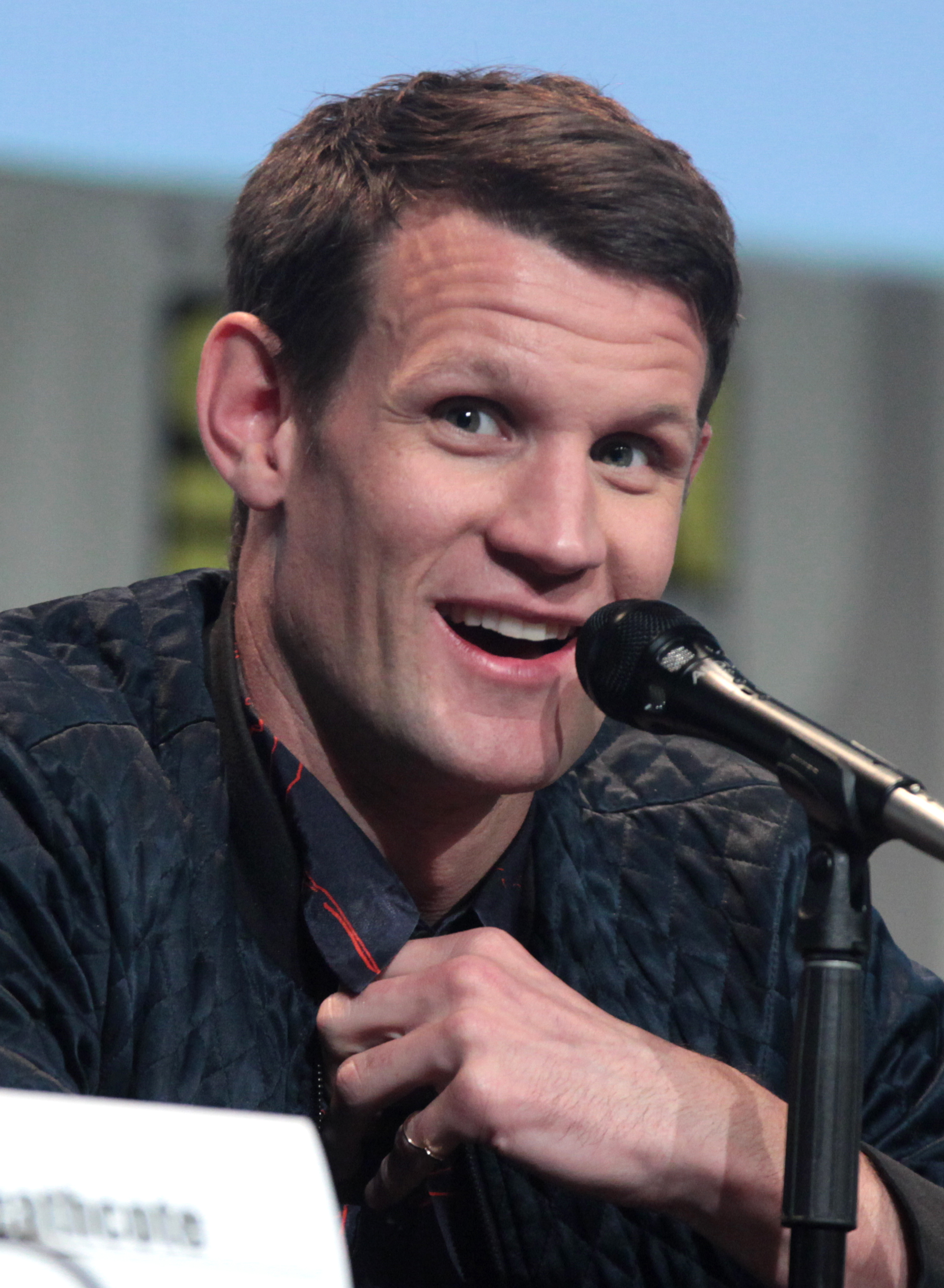
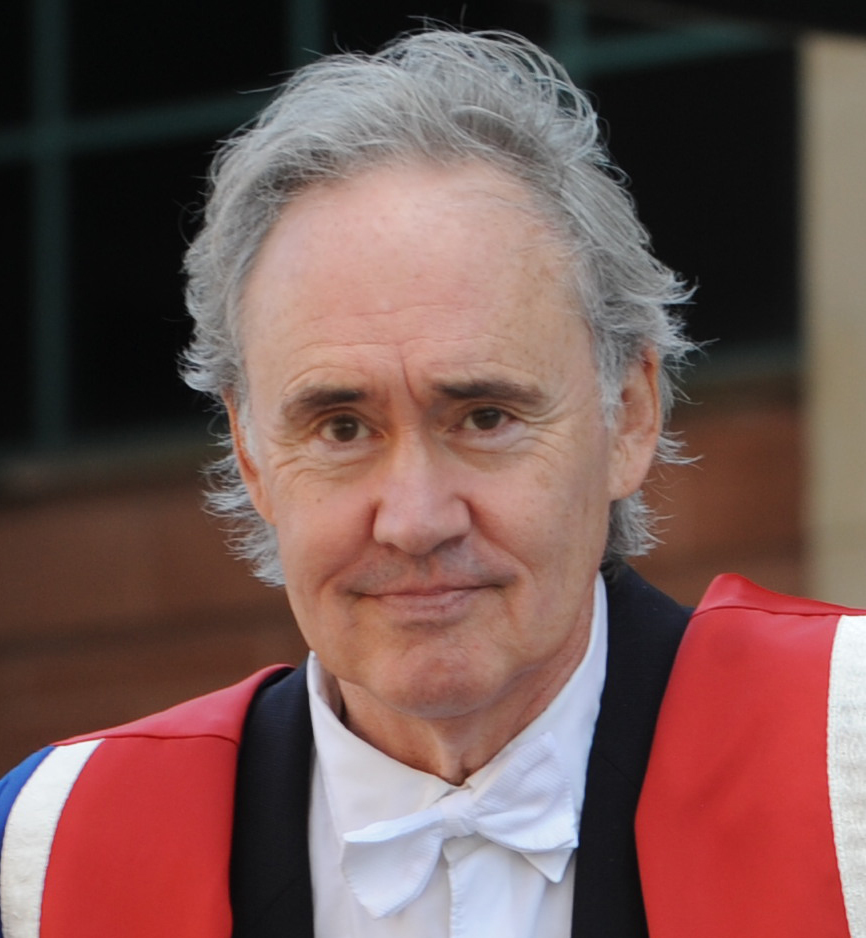
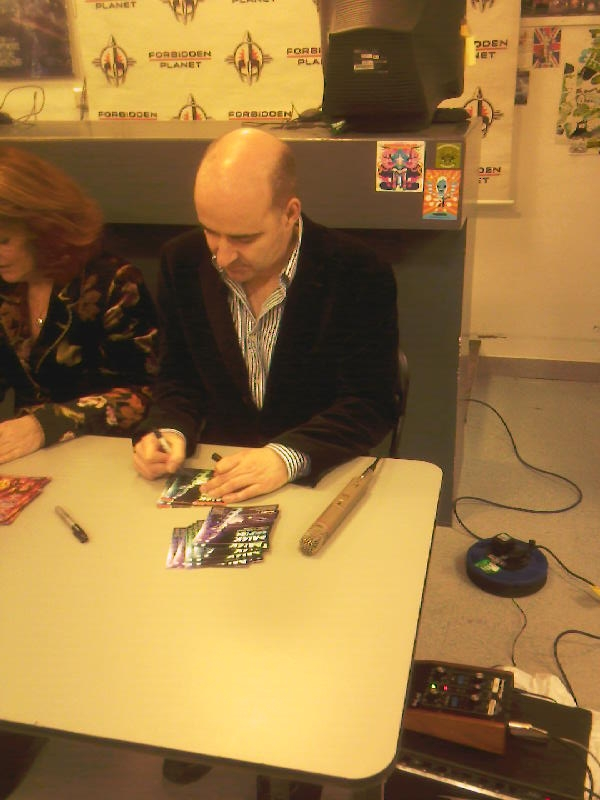
From left to right: Matt Smith, Nigel Planer, and Nicholas Briggs portrayed characters in the show.

The live show is an implied sequel to the 1973 Doctor Who television episode Carnival of Monsters, with Vorgenson being the son of the character Vorg from that episode. Moffat conceived the character of Vorgenson. The show features Matt Smith as the Eleventh Doctor. Smith appears in pre-recorded video clips during the show as he was busy filming the series at the time. Nigel Planer portrays Vorgenson. Planer was initially uninterested, but after seeing the depth of the role, he was willing to participate. Nicholas Briggs portrays Winston Churchill, taking over the role instead of Churchill's usual actor in the show, Ian McNeice. Briggs also voices several monsters in Live. Several antagonists from throughout the series also appear as part of the show, including the Judoon, Clockwork Droids, Silurians, Weeping Angels, Cybermen, Daleks, and Scarecrows.

The show premiered in Wembley Arena on 8 October 2010 and proceeded to tour throughout the United Kingdom.

== Reception ==
Pete Dillion-Trenchard, writing for Den of Geek, praised the performances of Smith, Planer, and Briggs, as well as the final scene with the Daleks. However, he felt as though the show was not well put together, criticizing the repetitive nature of its format, sound issues with the mix of dialogue and music, and visual issues with watching the show from farther back in the seats. Paul Simpson, writing for Total Sci-Fi Online, praised the show's production and performances, as well as the music score from Foster. Dominic Cavendish from The Daily Telegraph, highlighted the likeability of the production, citing the appeal of seeing elements of the series in a live form, though he critiqued the high cost of admission and childish nature of the production. Dan Martin, writing for The Guardian, also found the production to be more fitting for younger audiences, but praised the usage of elements from the series, such as the monsters, music, and pre-filmed segment featuring Smith.
