= The Crash of the Elysium =

Theatrical play

The Crash of the Elysium is a one-hour theatrical work created originally for children by the British company Punchdrunk, centred on the unexplained disappearance of a Victorian steamer named the Elysium and its investigation by the Eleventh Doctor from the television series Doctor Who. It premiered at MediaCityUK in Salford from 1 to 17 July 2011 as part of the Manchester International Festival, with a central narrative idea from Steven Moffat and written by Tom MacRae. It features the Weeping Angels and footage of Matt Smith as the Doctor specially recorded for the show. Its target audience is children from 6 to 12, with adults allowed in if accompanied by a child on "family" shows. A number of adults-only shows were subsequently added following requests from the public. On 16 July 2011, Matt Smith made a surprise visit to the show, appearing in character in place of the final video sequence. The show was remounted in Ipswich in 2012 as part of London 2012's Olympics festival.

Alfred Hickling of The Guardian awarded the production five out of five stars.
