= List of Nicholas Briggs credits =

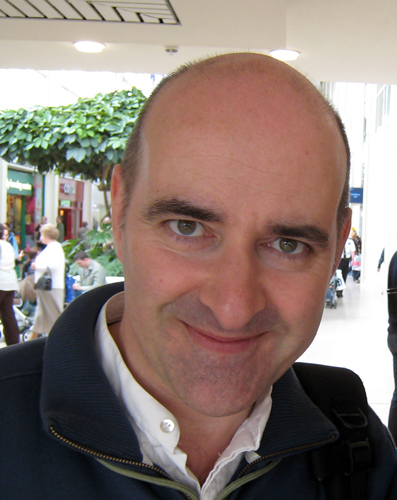
Briggs in 2008

Nicholas Briggs is an English actor, writer, director, producer, sound designer and composer. He is best known for his involvement with the television series Doctor Who and its licensed spin-offs; he has voiced the Daleks and Cybermen on television since 2005, and has served as executive producer of Big Finish Productions since 2006, for which he has written, directed and produced licensed Doctor Who audio dramas.

Briggs first came to prominence through his involvement in the fan-produced audio drama series Audio Visuals (1985–1991) and various direct-to-video Doctor Who spin-offs such as Wartime (1987) and the Auton trilogy (1997–1999). He was one of the founding creative figures of Big Finish, and voiced the Daleks in their licensed Doctor Who audio dramas. He also appeared on screen in the BBC Doctor Who productions Torchwood (2009), An Adventure in Space and Time (2013) and The Five(ish) Doctors Reboot (2013).

Briggs directed the BBC Radio 4 comedy Nebulous (2005–2008) and an audio drama adaptation of The Prisoner (2016–2017). He appeared in Noel Clarke's films Adulthood (2008) and 4.3.2.1. (2010). Since 2010, he has frequently portrayed Sherlock Holmes in stage and audio productions.

== Film ==
Year	Title	Director	Writer	Actor	Role	Notes	Ref.
1987	Wartime	Assistant	No	Yes	Soldier (uncredited)	Direct-to-video short film	
1991	The Corridor Sketch	No	No	Yes	Reporter	Short film	
1993	The Stranger: In Memory Alone	No	Yes	Yes	Minor	Direct-to-video	
1993	The Airzone Solution	No	Yes	Yes	Sam Flint	Direct-to-video	
1994	The Stranger: The Terror Game	No	Yes	Yes	Raven	Composer; Direct-to-video	
1994	The Stranger: Breach of the Peace	No	Yes	Yes	Evans	Direct-to-video	
1995	The Stranger: Eye of the Beholder	No	Yes	Yes	Soldier	Direct-to-video	
1997	Auton	Yes	Yes	No		Direct-to-video	
1998	Auton 2: Sentinel	Yes	Yes	Yes	Mike	Direct-to-video	
1999	Auton 3: Awakening	No	No	Yes		Credited as Arthur Wallis; Direct-to-video	
2008	Adulthood	No	No	Yes	Max		
2010	4.3.2.1.	No	No	Yes	Barry		
2011	Cleaning Up	No	No	Yes	Ted	Short film	
2017	The Lego Batman Movie	No	No	Yes	Daleks		

=== Documentary appearances ===
Year	Title	Director	Writer	Actor	Notes	Ref.
1986–2002	Myth Makers			Yes	Direct-to-video	
1998	Lust in Space	No	No	Yes	Direct-to-video	

== Television ==
Year	Title	Role	Notes	Ref.
2002	The League of Gentlemen	Garden Centre Worker	Episode: "The Medusa Touch"	
2004	Coupling	Dalek	Episode: "Nightlines"	
2005–present	Doctor Who	Various roles, notably the Daleks, Cybermen, Judoon and Ice Warriors	Voice role	
2009	Doctor Who Prom	Dalek	Concert broadcast; voice role	
2009	Lewis	Solicitor	Episode: "Counter Culture Blues"	
2009	Torchwood	Rick Yates	Episode: "Children of Earth: Day Four"	
2009	The Sarah Jane Adventures	Captain Tybo	Episode: "Prisoner of the Judoon"; voice role	
2010	BBC Proms	Dalek	Concert broadcast; voice role	
2013	BBC Proms	Dalek	Concert broadcast; voice role	
2013	An Adventure in Space and Time	Peter Hawkins		
2013	The Five(ish) Doctors Reboot	Dalek Operator		
2015	The Big Fat Quiz of the Year	Dalek	Voice role	
2016	Prisoner Zero		1 episode; voice role	
2023	Destination: Skaro	Nyder	Voice role	
2023	The Daleks in Colour	Additional Dalek voices		
2024	BBC Proms	Dalek, The Vlinx	Concert broadcast; voice role	
2025	Obsolete	Dalek voices		

=== Appearances as self ===
Year	Title	Notes	Ref.
2007	The Weakest Link	Doctor Who Special	

== Theatre ==
Year	Title	Role	Venue	Ref.
2008	Holmes and the Ripper	Sherlock Holmes	Theatre Royal, Nottingham	
2010	Doctor Who Live	Winston Churchill		
2012	Only Human			
2024	Stingray: Deadly Concerto Live Concert Performance			

== Audio drama ==
Year	Title	Director	Writer	Actor	Character	Notes	Ref.
1998–2012	Bernice Summerfield			Yes	Various roles, notably the Daleks		
1999–2020	Doctor Who: The Monthly Adventures	Yes	Yes	Yes	Various roles, notably the Daleks	Directed 41 stories	
2001–2007	Dalek Empire	Yes	Yes	Yes	Various roles, notably the Daleks		
2001–2022	Doctor Who: The Seventh Doctor Adventures	Yes	Yes	Yes	Various roles, notably the Daleks		
2002–2004	Judge Dredd			Yes	Various roles		
2002–2003	Strontium Dog			Yes	Various roles		
2002–2006	Sarah Jane Smith			Yes	Various roles		
2002–2025	Doctor Who: The Sixth Doctor Adventures			Yes			
2005–2008	Nebulous	Yes	No	Yes			
2005–2009	Cyberman	Yes	Yes	Yes	Various roles, notably the Cybermen		
2005–2018	New Series Adventures	—N/a	Yes	Yes	Narrator		
2005–2023	Gallifrey			Yes			
2006	Sapphire and Steel	No	No	Yes	Arthur	1 episode	
2006–2011	Doctor Who: The Eighth Doctor Adventures	Yes	Yes	Yes	Various roles, notably the Daleks		
2006–2007	I, Davros	No	No	Yes	Baran, Daleks		
2007–2022	Doctor Who: The Companion Chronicles			Yes			
2008	Doctor Who: The Stageplays			Yes			
2008	Stargate Atlantis			Yes	Doctor David Glennie		
2008–2022	Doctor Who: The Fifth Doctor Adventures	No	No	Yes			
2009–2024	Doctor Who: Target Novelisation Audiobooks			Yes			
2009–2025	Doctor Who: The Lost Stories			Yes			
2010	Doctor Who: The Four Doctors	Yes	No	Yes	Daleks	Co-directed with Ken Bentley	
2010–2025	Sherlock Holmes			Yes			
2011	Doctor Who: The Five Companions			Yes	Daleks		
2012	The Confessions of Dorian Gray			Yes	Sherlock Holmes	1 episode	
2012–2025	Doctor Who: The Fourth Doctor Adventures			Yes			
2013	Doctor Who: Destiny of the Doctor	No	No	Yes			
2013	Doctor Who: The Light at the End	Yes	Yes	Yes	The Vess		
2014	Charlotte Pollard			Yes			
2014	Night Terrace			Yes			
2014	Good Omens			Yes	Anforth, Metatron	3 episodes	
2012–2015	Doctor Who: Dark Eyes	Yes		Yes			
2015	The Worlds of Big Finish			Yes	Sherlock Holmes		
2015	Doctor Who: The Novel Adaptations			Yes			
2015–2018	UNIT: The New Series			Yes	Various roles		
2016	Doctor Who: The Churchill Years			Yes			
2016	Doctor Who: Friend from the Future	No	No	Yes	Dalek		
2016	Doctor Who: Classic Doctor Novel Readings			Yes	Cyberman		
2016	Doctor Who: Short Trips Rarities			Yes			
2016–2017	The Prisoner			Yes	Various roles	3 episodes	
2016–2021	Doctor Who: The Early Adventures			Yes			
2016–2024	Doctor Who: Classic Doctors New Monsters			Yes			
2017	Doctor Who: The Ninth Doctor Chronicles	No	No	Yes	Narrator		
2017–2021	Doctor Who: The Tenth Doctor Adventures	Yes	No	Yes			
2017–2025	The War Master			Yes			
2018	Class: The Audio Adventures			Yes			
2018–2021	Doctor Who: New Series Target Novelisation Audiobooks			Yes	Narrator	Audiobook series	
2019	Doctor Who: The Legacy of Time			Yes		2 episodes	
2019	Doctor Who: The Further Adventures of Lucie Miller			Yes	Daleks	1 episode	
2020	The New Counter-Measures			Yes			
2020	Doctor Who: Time Lord Victorious	No	No	Yes			
2020–2025	Susan's War			Yes			
2021	Master!			Yes	Daleks		
2021	Jenny - The Doctor's Daughter			Yes			
2021	Doctor Who: Stranded	No	No	Yes			
2021–2022	Stingray			Yes			
2021–2022	Doctor Who: The Audio Novels			Yes	Daleks, Cybermen		
2021–2023	Doctor Who: The Ninth Doctor Adventures	Yes	Yes	Yes	Various roles		
2021–2023	The Diary of River Song	No	No	Yes	Various roles		
2021–2024	Doctor Who: The Eleventh Doctor Chronicles			Yes			
2022	Doctor Who: Peladon			Yes			
2023	Doctor Who: Once and Future			Yes	Daleks		
2023	Doom's Day: Dying Hours			Yes			
2024	Thunderbirds			Yes			
2024	Doctor Who: The Sirens of Time Redux			Yes			
2024–2025	Stingray: Deadly Uprising - Marine Minutes			Yes			
2024–2025	Doctor Who: Classic Series Audio Originals			Yes			
2024–2025	The Paternoster Gang	No	No	Yes			
2025	V UK			Yes			
2025	Doctor Who: The Fugitive Doctor			Yes			
2025	Dark Gallifrey			Yes			
2025	Comedy Playhouse			Yes	Lord Buckingham		

== Video games ==
Year	Title	Role	Notes	Ref.
2003	Judge Dredd: Dredd Vs. Death	Judge Death		
2010	Doctor Who: The Adventure Games	Daleks, Cybermen, Oswald Fox	Daleks in "City of the Daleks" Cybermen in "Blood of the Cybermen" Oswald Fox in "Shadows of the Vashta Nerada"	
2014	The Doctor and the Dalek	Various roles, including the Daleks		
2015	Lego Dimensions	Daleks, Cybermen	Uncredited	
2019	Doctor Who: The Edge of Time			
2019	Doctor Who Infinity	Charlie	Episode: "The Horror of Flat Holm"	
2021	Doctor Who: The Edge of Reality	Daleks	Credited as Nick Briggs	
2022	Eve Online	Daleks	Voice role	

== Web ==
Year	Title	Role	Notes	Ref.
2002	Doctor Who: Real Time	Cyber-Controller, Professor Osborn	Webcast audio series	
2006	Tardisodes	Dalek	Episode: "Doomsday"; voice role	
2018, 2020	Gerry Anderson's Firestorm	R.E.M.U.S.	Voice role	
2020	Daleks!	Daleks	Voice; main role	
