= List of Colin Baker performances =

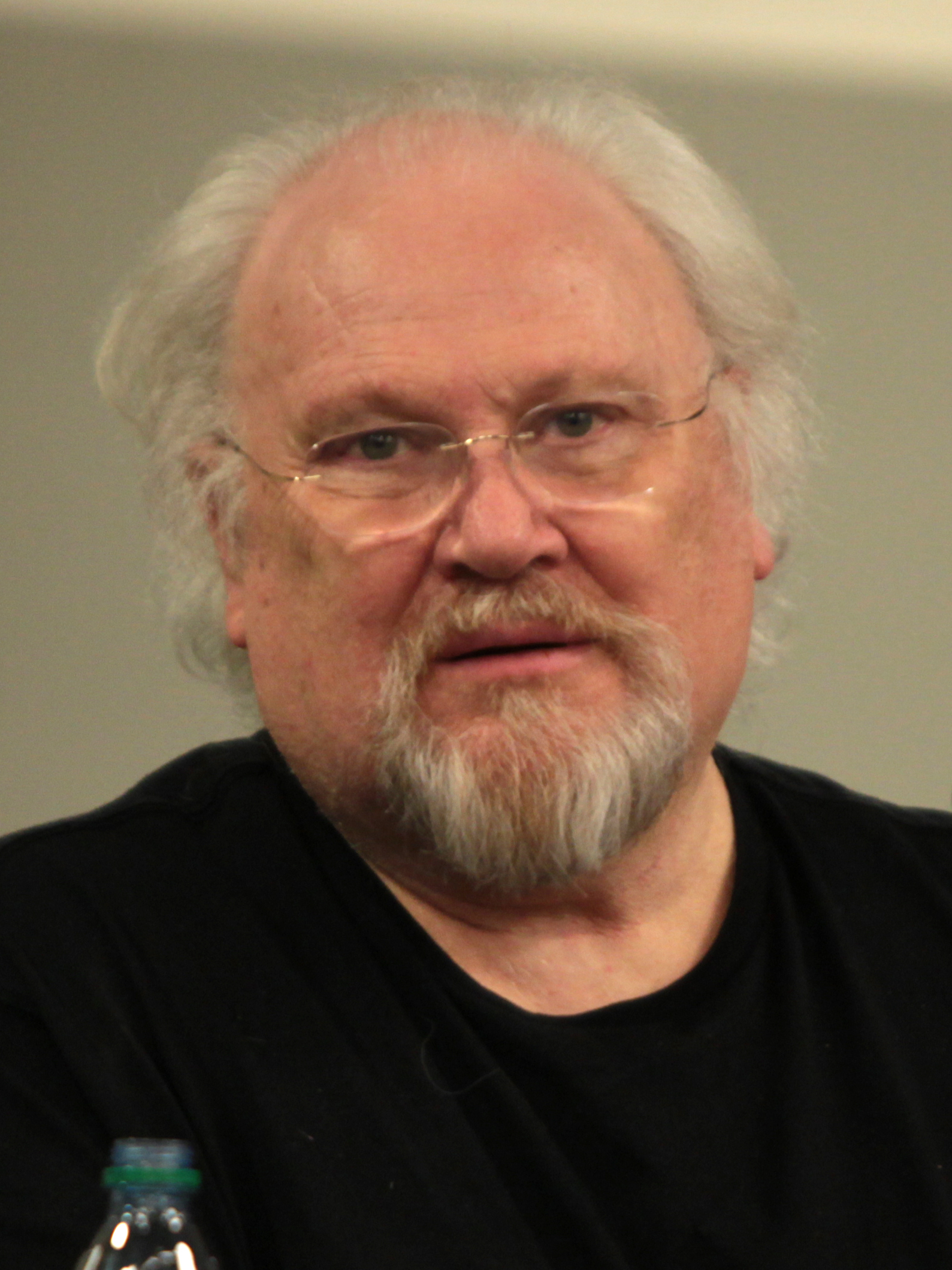
Baker at the 2014 Phoenix Comicon Fan Fest

Colin Baker is an English actor who has worked in the mediums of film, television, stage and audio dramas. Below are a list of his credits.

== Film ==
Film
Year	Title	Role	Notes	Ref(s)
1981	Dangerous Davies: The Last Detective	William Lind		
1989	Zandorra			
1989	Clockwork			
1991	Summoned By Shadows	The Stranger		
1992	More Than A Messiah	The Stranger		
1993	In Memory Alone	The Stranger		
1993	The Airzone Solution	Arnold Davies		
1994	The Terror Game	The Stranger		
1994	The Zero Imperative	Peter Russell		
1994	Breach of the Peace	The Stranger		
1995	Eye of the Beholder	The Stranger		
1997	The Harpist	Father Rupitsch		
1999	Soul's Ark	Galico		
2000	The Asylum	Arbuthnot		
2014	Finding Richard	Grandad	Short film	
2014	Shadows of a Stranger	William Fallon		
2015	A Dozen Summers	The Narrator		
2015	A Christmas Carol	Charles Dickens		
2016	Last Man on Earth	Professor James Friedkin	Short film	
2017	Arrows of Time	The Narrator	Screened at planetariums	
2021	Hiraeth	Wynn Seaward		
2021	You Might Get Lost	Conrad		
2021	The Ghosts of Borley Rectory	Charles Sutton		
2022	Minacious	DS Rawlins	Retitled The Caller	
2023	Secrets of a Wallaby Boy	Bruce (voice)		
2023	Christmas at the Holly Day Inn	Ben Holly		

== Television ==
Year	Title	Role	Notes	Ref.
1970	The Adventures of Don Quick	Rebel	Episode: "People Isn't Everything"	
1970	Happy Ever After	Receptionist	Episode: "The Ambassador"	
1970	No – That's Me Over Here!	Uncredited	2 episodes	
1970	Roads to Freedom	Claude	3 episodes	
1971	The Mind of Mr. J.G. Reeder	Reigate	Episode: "The Shadow Man"	
1971	Public Eye	Town Hall Clerk	Episode: "The Man Who Didn't Eat Sweets"	
1971	Cousin Bette	Count Wenceslas Steinbock	5 episodes	
1971	The Silver Sword	German Lieutenant	Episode: #1.3	
1971	Now Look Here	Uncredited	Episode: #1.4	
1972	War & Peace	Anatole Kuragin	4 episodes	
1972	The Moonstone	John Herncastle	Episode: #1.1	
1972	The Man Outside	Glover	Episode: "Murder Story"	
1972	Villains	Reporter	Episode: "His Dad Named Him After the General"	
1973	The Edwardians	Joseph Laycock	Episode: "Daisy"	
1973	Harriet's Back in Town	Mike Baker	2 episodes	
1973	Orson Welles Great Mysteries	George Barclay	Episode: "A Terribly Strange Bed"	
1974	Within These Walls	David Jenkins	Episode: "Prisoner by Marriage"	
1974	The Carnforth Practice	Bob Anderson	Episode: "Undue Influence"	
1974	Fall of Eagles	Crown Prince Willie	2 episodes	
1974–1976	The Brothers	Paul Merroney	46 episodes	
1979	Doctors and Nurses	Mr. Bennett	Episode: "Mums and Dads"	
1980	Blakes 7	Bayban	Episode: "City at the Edge of the World"	
1980	For Maddie with Love	Uncredited		
1982	Juliet Bravo	Frankie Miller	Episode: "The Intruder"	
1983	The Citadel	Mr. Vaughan	Episode: "Part 4"	
1983	Doctor Who	Commander Maxil	Serial: Arc of Infinity; 3 episodes	
1984	Swallows and Amazons Forever!: Coot Club	Dr. Dudgeon	TV film	
1984	Swallows and Amazons Forever!: The Big Six	Dr. Dudgeon	TV film	
1984–1986, 1993, 2022	Doctor Who	Sixth Doctor	34 episodes	
1985	Jim'll Fix It	Sixth Doctor	Episode: "A Fix with Sontarans"	
1986	Roland Rat: The Series	Sixth Doctor	Episode: #1.3	
1989	Casualty	Colin Miles	Episode: "Accidents Happen"	
1993	The Young Indiana Jones Chronicles	Harry George Chauvel	Unaired episode: "Palestine, October 1917"; released in 1999 as "Daredevils of the Desert"	
1995	Harry's Mad	Mr. Perkins	Episode: "Meaty Chunks"	
1997	The Famous Five	Fake Mr. Brent	2 episodes	
1997	Jonathan Creek	Hedley Shale	Episode: "The Wrestler's Tomb"	
1997	The Knock	Donald Dewhurst / Desmond Dewhurst	4 episodes	
1997	A Dance to the Music of Time	Canon Fenneau	Episode: "Post War"	
1997	The Bill	William Guthrie	Episode: "Going Down"	
1998	Casualty	David Vincent	Episode: "An Eye for an Eye"	
1999	Sunburn	John Buchanan	Episode: #1.2	
1999	The Waiting Time	Giles Fleming	TV film	
1999	Dangerfield	Vicar	Episode: "Haunted"	
2000	Hollyoaks	The Judge	Episode: #1.524	
2000	Time Gentlemen Please	Professor Baker	Episode: "Day of the Trivheads"	
2001	Doctors	Jack Howard	Episode: "Matters of Principle"	
2004	The Impressionable Jon Culshaw	Mr. Allen	Episode: #1.2	
2004	The 4 Musketeers	Rutaford	2 episodes	
2005	Little Britain	Man in Regatta Tent	Deleted scene	
2006	The Afternoon Play	Judge	Episode: "Your Mother Should Know"	
2006	Doctors	Charles Dillon	Episode: "Honourable Gentlemen"	
2009	Kingdom	Mr. Dodds	Episode: #3.2	
2009	Doctors	Professor Claybourne Jarvis	Episode: "The Romantics"	
2010	Hustle	Phil	Episode: "Tiger Troubles"	
2011	Doctors	Augustus Bloom	Episode: "Every Heart That Beats"	
2013	The Five(ish) Doctors Reboot	Colin Baker	Television film	
2014	Comedy Feeds	Colin Baker	Episode: "The Committee Meeting"	
2015	Star Trek Continues	Minister Amphidamas	Episode: "The White Iris"	
2021	Emmerdale	Michael	Episode: #1.9156	
2023	Tales of the TARDIS	Sixth Doctor	Episode: "Vengeance on Varos"	
2025	Shakespeare & Hathaway: Private Investigators	Reynard Lennox	Episode: “The Evil that Men Do”	

== Stage ==
Year	Title	Role	Notes	Ref.
1969	Plaintiff in a Pretty Hat		Arts Theatre, Cambridge	
	The Other House		Mermaid Theatre	
1970	Wizard of Oz	Lord Growlie	Guildford	
1971	Caesar and Cleopatra	Porter 1	Chichester Festival Theatre Company	
1972	Conduct Unbecoming	Arthur Drake	Liverpool Playhouse	
1972	Vivat! Vivat Regina!	Darnley	Liverpool Playhouse	
1973	Hamlet	Laertes	Theatre Royal, Windsor	
1975	September Tide	Evan Davies	The Forum Theatre Billingham; other locations	
1977	Let's Do It Your Way	Unknown	The Playhouse, Weston-super-Mare; Harrogate Theatre; other locations	
1978	Trap for a Lonely Man	The Man	Theatre Royal, York; New Theatre Royal Lincoln; other locations	
1978	The Flip Side	Theo	Ashcroft Theatre, Croydon; Yvonne Arnaud Theatre, Guildford; other locations	
1979	Dick Whittington	Dick	Cork	
1980	Dick Whittington	King Rat	New Theatre Royal Lincoln	
1981	The Norman Conquests	Norman	Windsor Theatre Company	
1981	Goldilocks and the Three Bears	Heinkel	New Theatre Royal Lincoln	
1982	Goldilocks and the Three Bears	Heinkel	Gordon Craig Theatre, Stevenage	
1982	Relatively Speaking	Bill Kenwright	Ashcroft Theatre, Croydon; Richmond Theatre; other locations	
1984	Cinderella	Buttons	Gaumont Theatre, Southampton	
1985	Aladdin		Beck Theatre, Hayes	
1986	Cinderella	Buttons	Theatre Royal, Brighton	
1987	Robinson Crusoe	Bluebeard the Pirate	Wimbledon Theatre, London	
1987-8	Corpse!		Theatre Royal, Nottingham; Strand Theatre, London	
1988	Deathtrap	Sidney Bruhl	Theatre Royal, Bath; Theatre Royal, Winchester; other locations	
1989	Doctor Who: The Ultimate Adventure	The Doctor	Grand Theatre, Leeds	
1989	Peter Pan	Captain Hook	Brighton Dome	
1989	Run For Your Wife		West End of London	
1990	Spider's Web	Inspector Lord	Theatre Royal, Bath; Theatre Royal, Windsor; other locations	
1990	Born in the Gardens	Mo	Theatre Royal, Nottingham; Farnham; Swansea Grand Theatre; other locations	
1990	Jack and the Beanstalk	Fleshcreep	Hull New Theatre	
1991	Time and Time Again	Leonard	Theatre Royal, Bath	
1991	Privates on Parade			
1992	Dick Whittington	The Captain	Weymouth Pavilion	
1992	Death and the Maiden			
1993	Peter Pan	Captain Hook	Princess Theatre, Torquay	
1994	Aladdin	Widow Twankey	Theatre Royal, Brighton	
1994	Not Now Darling			
1995	Peter Pan	Captain Hook	Assembly Hall Theatre, Tunbridge Wells	
1996	Dick Whittington	King Rat	New Theatre Royal Lincoln	
1996	Great Expectations			
1996	Love Letters			
1997	Babes in the Wood	The Sheriff of Nottingham	Norwich	
1998	Jack and the Beanstalk	Dame Durden	The Wyvern	
1998	Kind Hearts and Coronets			
1999	Dick Whittington	King Rat	Wycombe Swan, High Wycombe	
2000	Out of Order	The Manager	Theatre Royal, Bath; Theatre Royal, Nottingham; other locations	
2000	Snow White and the Seven Dwarfs	Herman the Henchman	Wycombe Swan, High Wycombe	
2001	Aladdin	Abanazar	Marlowe Theatre, Canterbury	
2002	Dick Whittington	Sarah the Cook	Wyvern Theatre, Swindon	
2002-3	Corpse!	Major	Milton Keynes Theatre	
2003	Snow White and the Seven Dwarfs	The Mirror	Canterbury	
2003	HMS Pinafore		Carl Rosa Opera Company	
2004	The Haunted Hotel	Sir Francis Westwick	Mercury Theatre, Colchester; Arts Centre, Darlington; other locations	
2004	Dick Whittington	Sarah the Cook	Theatre Royal, Nottingham	
2005	Snow White and the Seven Dwarfs	Nurse Nelly	Hall for Cornwall, Truro	
2005	Dracula	Van Helsing		
2006	Love Letters			
2006	Strangers on a Train			
2007	Dick Whittington	King Rat	Theatre Royal, Norwich	
2007-8	She Stoops to Conquer	Mr Hardcastle	Richmond Theatre; Birmingham Repertory Theatre; other locations	
2008	Noises Off			
2008	Jack and the Beanstalk	Fleshcreep	Theatre Royal, Bath	
2009-10	Jack and the Beanstalk	Fleshcreep	Festival Theatre, Malvern	
2010	House of Ghosts	Inspector Morse	Devonshire Park Theatre, Eastbourne; Gordon Craig Theatre, Stevenage; other locations	
2011	Jack and the Beanstalk	Fleshcreep	Palace Theatre, Mansfield	
2011	The Woman in White			
2013	Aladdin	Abanazar	The Anvil, Basingstoke	
2022, 2024, 2025	The Hound of the Baskervilles	Sherlock Holmes	Crime and Comedy Theatre Company	
2023	A Christmas Carol	Ebenezer Scrooge	Crime and Comedy Theatre Company	
2025	The Sign of Four	Sherlock Holmes	Crime and Comedy Theatre Company	

== Audio drama ==
Year	Title	Role	Notes	Ref.
1985	Doctor Who: Slipback	Sixth Doctor	6-part story	
1999–2021	Doctor Who: The Monthly Adventures	Sixth Doctor	170 episodes	
2006	Gallifrey	Commander Maxil	Episode: "Appropriation"	
2009–present	Doctor Who: The Lost Stories	Sixth Doctor	13 episodes	
2011–2018	Jago & Litefoot	Sixth Doctor	8 episodes	
2015–present	The Sixth Doctor Adventures	Sixth Doctor	28 episodes	
2016–present	Classic Doctors, New Monsters	Sixth Doctor	4 episodes	
2016	The Diary of River Song	Sixth Doctor	2 episodes	
2021	Avalon	Bayban the Butcher	Volume Two	
2021	Bayban the Butcher	Bayban the Butcher		

== Video games ==
Year	Title	Role	Notes	Ref.
1997	Destiny of the Doctors	Sixth Doctor		
2015	Lego Dimensions	Sixth Doctor	Archive sound	
2024	Fallout: London	Mysterious Scientist 2	Guest voice role	

== Web ==
Year	Title	Role	Ref.
2020	The Doctors Say Thank You	Himself	
