= List of science fiction television programs, D =

This is an inclusive list of science fiction television programs whose names begin with the letter D.

== D ==
Live-action

- Dans une galaxie près de chez vous a.k.a. In a galaxy near you (1998–2001, Canada)
- Dark (2017-2020, Germany)
- Daredevil (2015–2018)
- Dark Angel (2000–2002)
- Dark Matter (2015–2017, Canada)
- Dark Realm (2001, anthology)
- Dark Season (1991, UK)
- Dark Side of the Sun, The (1983, UK)
- Dark Skies (1996–1997)
- Darkroom (1981–1982, anthology)
- Day After, The (1983, film)
- Day After Tomorrow, The a.k.a. Into Infinity (1975, UK, special)
- Day Break (2006–2008)
- Day of the Triffids, The (franchise):
  - Day of the Triffids, The (1981, UK, miniseries)
  - Day of the Triffids, The (2009, UK, miniseries)
- Dead at 21 (1994)
- Dead Man's Gun (1997–1999, anthology) (elements of science fiction in some episodes)
- Dead Zone, The (2002–2007)
- Deadly Earnest a.k.a. Deadly Earnest's Awful Movies (1966–1972, Australia)
- Deadly Games (1995–1997)
- Debris (2021)
- Defiance (2013–2015)
- Defying Gravity (2009)
- Denkou Choujin Gridman (1993–1994, Japan)
- Dennō Coil (2007)
- Dennou Keisatsu Cybercop (1988–1989, Japan)
- Dick Spanner, P.I. (1986–1987, UK, stop-motion animation)
- Dimension 404 (2017, anthology)
- Dimensions of Fear (1963, UK) IMDb
- Dinosapien (2007, UK/Canada)
- Dinotopia (franchise):
  - Dinotopia (2002, miniseries)
  - Dinotopia (2002–2003)
- Disneyland a.k.a. Wonderful World of Disney, The (1954–2008, anthology) (elements of science fiction in some episodes)
- Do Over (2002)
- Doctor Who (franchise):
  - Doctor Who (1963–1989, 1996, 2005–present, UK)
  - K-9 and Company (1981, UK, Doctor Who spin-off, pilot)
  - A Fix with Sontarans (1985, UK, segment)
  - Dimensions in Time (1993, UK, special, crossover)
  - P.R.O.B.E. (1994–1996, UK, Doctor Who spin-offs, films):
    - Zero Imperative, The (1994, UK, Doctor Who spin-off, film)
    - Devil of Winterborne, The (1995, UK, Doctor Who spin-off, film)
    - Unnatural Selection (1996, UK, Doctor Who spin-off, film)
    - Ghosts of Winterborne (1996, UK, Doctor Who spin-off, film)
  - Doctor Who (1996, US, TV movie)
  - Doctor Who and the Curse of Fatal Death a.k.a. The Curse of Fatal Death (1999, UK, special)
  - Doctor Who: Children in Need a.k.a. Born Again (2005, UK, special)
  - Attack of the Graske (2005, UK, interactive mini-episode)
  - Torchwood (2006–2011, UK, Doctor Who spin-off):
    - Torchwood: Children of Earth (2009, miniseries, third season)
    - Torchwood: Miracle Day (2011, fourth season)
  - Totally Doctor Who (2006–2007, UK)
  - Sarah Jane Adventures, The (2007–2011, UK, Doctor Who spin-off)
  - Time Crash (2007, UK, mini-episode)
  - Music of the Spheres (2009, UK, mini-episode)
  - Doctor Who: Tonight's the Night (2009, UK, special)
  - K-9 (2009–2010, UK/Australia, Doctor Who spin-off)
  - Class (2016, UK, Doctor Who spin-off)
- Dollhouse (2009–2010)
- Doom Runners (1997, Australia, film)
- Doomwatch (1970–1972, UK)
- Dune: Prophecy (2024)

Animated

- D.Gray-man (2006–2008, Japan, animated)
- Dallas & Robo (2018, animated)
- Dan Dare: Pilot of the Future (2001, UK, animated)
- Dan Vs. (2011–2013, animated) (elements of science fiction in some episodes)
- Danball Senki (franchise):
  - Danball Senki a.k.a. Cardboard Chronicles (2011–2012, Japan, animated)
  - Danball Senki W (Dabaru) a.k.a. Cardboard Chronicles W (Double) (2012–2013, Japan, animated)
  - Danball Senki Wars (2013, Japan, animated)
- Dancouga – Super Beast Machine God (1985, Japan, animated)
- Danny Phantom (2004-2007, animated)
- Darkstalkers (1995, animated) Epguides IMDb (elements of science fiction)
- Darkwing Duck (1991–1992, animated) (elements of science fiction in some episodes)
- DC Nation Shorts (2012, shorts, animated)
- Defenders of the Earth (1986–1987, animated)
- Delilah and Julius (2005–2008, Canada, animated, elements of science fiction)
- Delta State (2004–2006, France/Canada, animated) IMDb
- Desert Punk (2004–2005, Japan, animated)
- Dex Hamilton: Alien Entomologist (2007, Canada/Australia/UK, animated)
- Dexter's Laboratory (franchise):
  - Dexter's Laboratory a.k.a. Dexter's Lab (1996–2003, animated)
  - Dial M for Monkey (1996–1999, Dexter's Laboratory backup segment, animated)
  - Justice Friends, The (1996–1998, Dexter's Laboratory backup segment, animated)
- Di-Gata Defenders (2006–2008, Canada, animated) (elements of science fiction)
- Dino-Riders (1988, animated)
- Dinosaucers (1987, animated)
- Dinosaur King (franchise):
  - Dinosaur King a.k.a. Ancient Ruler Dinosaur King DKidz Adventure (2007–2008, Japan, animated)
  - Ancient Ruler Dinosaur King DKidz Adventure: Pterosaur Legend (2008, Japan, animated)
- Dinosaur War Izenborg (1977–1978, Japan, animated)
- DinoSquad (2007–2008, animated)
- Dirty Pair (1985, Japan, animated)
- Disney's Fluppy Dogs (1986, special, animated)
- DNA² (1994, Japan, animated)
- Doctor Who (franchise):
  - Doctor Who: The Infinite Quest (2007, UK, animated)
  - Doctor Who: Dreamland (2009, UK, animated)
- Doraemon (franchise):
  - Doraemon (1973, Japan, animated)
  - Doraemon (1979–2005, Japan, animated)
  - Doraemon (2005–present, Japan, animated)
- Dork Hunters from Outer Space (2008–2009, UK/Germany, animated) IMDb
- Dr. Slump (franchise):
  - Dr. Slump – Arale-chan (1981–1986, Japan, animated)
  - Doctor Slump (1997–1999, Japan, animated)
- Dragon Ball (franchise):
  - Dragon Ball (1986–1989, Japan, animated)
  - Dragon Ball Z a.k.a. DBZ (1989–1996, Japan, animated)
  - Dragon Ball Z: Bardock – The Father of Goku (1990, Japan, special, animated)
  - Dragon Ball Z: The History of Trunks (1993, Japan, special, animated)
  - Dragon Ball GT a.k.a. Dragon Ball G(rand) T(our) (1996–1997, Japan, animated)
  - Dragon Ball GT: A Hero's Legacy (1997, Japan, special, animated)
  - Dragon Ball Z Kai (2009–2015, Japan, animated)
- Dragon Booster (2004–2006, Canada, animated)
- Dragon Drive (2002–2003, Japan, animated)
- Dragon Flyz (1996–1997, France, animated)
- Dragonaut: The Resonance (2007–2008, Japan, animated)
- Duck Dodgers (2003–2006, animated)
