= Nicola Bryant =

English actress (born 1960)

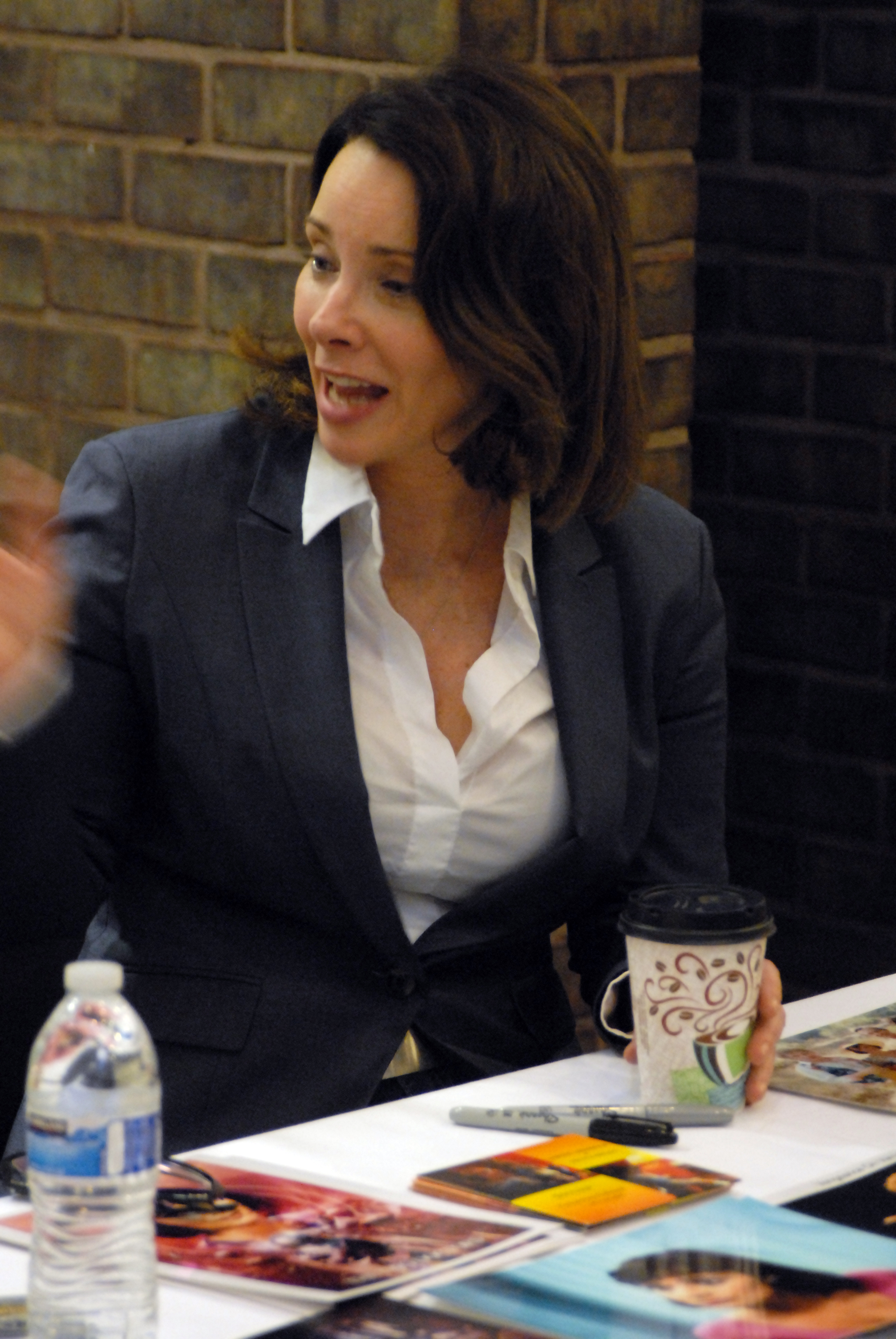
- Bryant in 2016
- Born: Nicola Jane Bryant; 11 October 1960 (age 66); Guildford, Surrey, England
- Education: Webber Douglas Academy of Dramatic Art
- Occupation: Actress
- Years active: 1983–present
- Known for: Doctor Who; The Biz; Star Trek Continues
- Partner: Nev Fountain
- Awards: 2022 British Horror Film Festival Best Supporting Actress
- Website: nicolabryant.net

Nicola Jane Bryant (born 11 October 1960) is an English actress best known for her role as Peri Brown, a companion to both the Fifth and Sixth Doctors, in the BBC science fiction television series Doctor Who, from 1984 to 1986.

== Early life ==
Nicola Bryant was born and grew up in a small village near Guildford in Surrey, the older of two daughters of Denis and Sheila Bryant. She has a younger sister, Tracy. She began taking dance classes at the age of three, and also took piano lessons. At the age of ten she auditioned to go to ballet schools, but was unable to take up places offered because of asthma. Upset by this development, she joined a local amateur dramatic group.

On leaving school she auditioned for all of the London drama schools, and took up a scholarship to the Webber Douglas Academy of Dramatic Art. In her final year there, she played the part of Nanette in a production of the musical No, No, Nanette.

== Career ==
Bryant's first professional part was as Peri Brown in Doctor Who. She played the part from 1984 to 1986, first with Peter Davison, and then with Colin Baker as the Doctor. Bryant's tenure on the show was met with raised eyebrows in some quarters as series producer John Nathan-Turner admitted (in his book Doctor Who: The Companions and elsewhere) that his intention was to pump up the sex appeal of the ageing series by casting the young actress who was often seen wearing low-cut outfits in the show. As the Doctor Who production team were only auditioning American actors for the role of Peri, Bryant's agent encouraged her to use an American accent until contracted for the role, and backtracked on a promise to inform the production of her nationality before any public appearances as herself. Bryant therefore continued to speak in an American accent throughout her time in the role, including in interviews and rehearsals, with only Baker becoming aware of her true nationality and accent.

Bryant appeared in the Doctor Who serial The Two Doctors (1985), and she enjoyed working with Patrick Troughton, who returned as the Second Doctor. During the programme's hiatus during 1985 and 1986, Bryant reprised the role of Peri in a BBC radio production entitled Slipback alongside Baker. As a consequence of the hiatus, Bryant's three-year contract expired half way through season 23; Nathan-Turner did not renew her contract as he did not wish for a companion to be part of the series for more years than previous Doctors.

After appearing in Doctor Who, Bryant spent nine months at the Savoy Theatre in the West End of London in the thriller Killing Jessica with Patrick Macnee, directed by Bryan Forbes. She was cast in other television roles, including a part in Blackadder's Christmas Carol (1988). In the early to mid-1990s, she co-starred with Baker in a series of made-for-video science fiction films entitled The Stranger for BBV, although the first few films in the series were little more than Doctor Who episodes in disguise. She also appeared alongside Baker, Davison, Sylvester McCoy and Jon Pertwee in another BBV production, The Airzone Solution, which includes a love scene between Baker and Bryant.

Bryant has reprised the role of Peri in several of the Big Finish Productions Doctor Who spin-off audio plays, appearing both with Peter Davison and Colin Baker. She also directed UNIT: The Wasting and Judge Dredd: 99 Code Red!.

In February 2006, she performed in a New End Theatre production of the Carl Djerassi play Taboos, and in early 2007 appeared in a London stage production of Tom Stoppard's Rock 'n' Roll at the Duke of York's Theatre. A DVD documentary, In The Footsteps of The Two Doctors, following Bryant's return to some of the locations featured in the Doctor Who serial The Two Doctors, was released in late 2006.

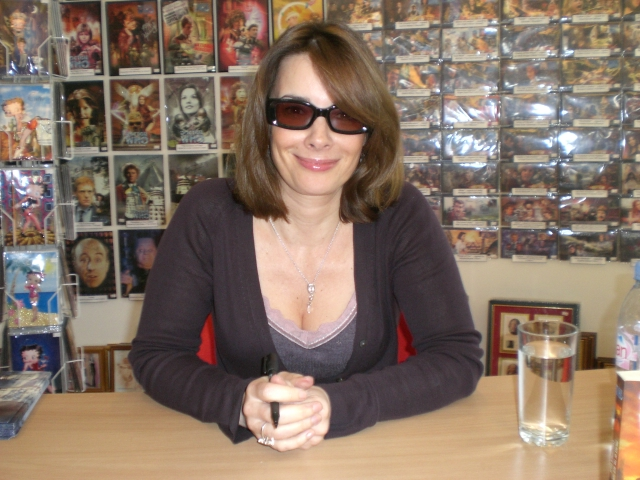
Bryant in 2008

She returned to the stage in 2008 in a touring production of an adaptation of Daphne du Maurier's "Don't Look Now", playing the part of Laura Baxter. This production continued into 2009.

In the summer of 2009, Bryant filmed an improvised documentary-style film for Australian director Ben Briand as well as recording eight audio stories for Big Finish as a "missing season" of adventures for Doctor Who. On 2 March 2010 she appeared in Holby City as a television news reporter, and in 2011 she featured in the Dark Shadows audio drama The Blind Painter. In 2013 she appeared in a Doctor Who-themed episode of the game show Pointless.

Bryant guest-starred as 'Lana' in the 2017 two-part finale of the internet series Star Trek Continues, which finishes the five-year mission of Star Trek: The Original Series.

Appearing in commercials, Bryant has been the face of Woolwich Building Society, National Saving, and Nurofen. Bryant was in the Ridley Scott Associates production for Axa Health Insurance.

Bryant's voice-over work spans more than three decades. She has been the voice behind BMW, Duchy Originals, Florida Orange Juice, Twinings Tea, Nationwide, Woolwich Building Society, medical and pharmaceutical companies and Bovis Houses. She has also voiced documentaries for the BBC and NBC.

In 2023, Bryant reprised her role as Peri Brown in the series Tales of the TARDIS.

== Filmography ==
=== Film ===
| Year | Title | Role | Notes |
|---|---|---|---|
| 1991 | Summoned By Shadows | Miss Brown | |
| 1992 | More Than A Messiah | Miss Brown | |
| 1993 | In Memory Alone | Miss Brown | |
| 1993 | The Airzone Solution | Elenya | |
| 1994 | The Terror Game | Miss Brown | (archive footage) (uncredited) |
| 1998 | Parting Shots | Beverley | |
| 2011 | Unlawful Killing | Romilly Weeks | |
| 2016 | The Head Hunter | Dr. Shaw | |
| 2021 | Midas | Charlotte Ward | |
| 2022 | The Wilds | Helen | (short) |
| TBA | Dreadnought: Invasion Six | Lord Doctor Elli Morsto | (Pre-production) |
| TBA | Chuck | Sister Hackett | (short) (Pre-production) |

=== Television ===
| Year | Title | Role | Notes |
|---|---|---|---|
| 1984–1986 | Doctor Who | Perpugilliam "Peri" Brown | 33 episodes |
| 1988 | Blackadder's Christmas Carol | Millicent | TV film |
| 1993 | Doctor Who: Dimensions in Time | Peri Brown | Children in Need special |
| 1995–1997 | The Biz | Martine Johnson | All 24 episodes |
| 1996 | The 10%ers | Julia | Episode: "Wedding" |
| 1998 | Animal Ark | Sara Lawson | Episode: "Bunnies in the Bathroom" |
| 2000 | Casualty | Susan Harris | Episode: "Fall Out" |
| 2000 | Doctors | Sonia Heyward-Smith | Episode: "Catch-22" |
| 2007 | Holby City | Catherine Sloman | Episode: "Someone to Watch Over Me" |
| 2008 | Love in Hyde Park | Isabel | |
| 2009 | My Family | Anne | Episode: "A Very Brief Encounter" |
| 2010 | My Family | Janet | Episode: "Ben Behaving Badly" |
| 2010 | Holby City | Reporter | Episode: "The Butterfly Effect: Part One" |
| 2010 | Doctors | Jackie Fallon | Episode: "A Naked Ambition" |
| 2010 | Scoop | Anne Boleyn | Episode: "Back Tud-or Future" |
| 2015 | The Promise | Emily Newman | Episode: "The New Name" |
| 2016 | Serial Thriller: The Head Hunter | Dr. Shaw | 2 episodes |
| 2016 | New Blood | Sophie Baxter | Episode: "Case 3, Part 2" |
| 2017 | Star Trek Continues | Lana | Episodes "To Boldly Go", Parts I and II |
| 2020 | Gentrification | Annabel de Winter | Episode: "Part Seven" |
| 2021 | The Effect | Sandra | 3 episodes |
| 2023 | Tales of the TARDIS | Peri Brown | Episode: "Vengeance on Varos" |

=== Audio ===
| Year | Title | Role | Notes |
|---|---|---|---|
| 2002 | Judge Dredd | Judge Mordin | Episode: "Trapped on Titan" |
| 2011 | Dark Shadows | Eloise Verinder | Episode: "The Blind Painter" |
| 2011 | Dark Shadows | Mrs. Gibbs | Episode: "The Poisoned Soul" |
| 2011 | Dark Shadows | Grace Collins | Episode: "The Crimson Pearl" |
| 2013 | The Mervyn Stone Mysteries | Verity Mycroft | Episode: "The Axeman Cometh" |
| 2014 | The Night of the Triffids | Kerris | Audio film |
| 2014 | The Confessions of Dorian Gray | Claudia Markham | Episode: "Echoes" |
| 2015 | Iris Wildthyme: Wildthyme Reloaded | Maggie | Episode: "Comeback of the Scorchies" |
| 2015 | Iris Wildthyme: Wildthyme Reloaded | Mabel | Episode: "The Slots of Giza" |
| 2016 | Painkiller | Monica | Audiobook |
| 2017 | Waking Hell | Leila Fenech | Audiobook |
| 2020 | Doctor Who: The Sixth Doctor Adventures | Peri Brown | 4 episodes |
| 2021 | The Effect | Sandra | 3 episodes |
| 2024 | Doctor Who: The Sixth Doctor Adventures | Peri Brown | 8 episodes |

=== Theatre ===
| Year | Title | Role | Notes |
|---|---|---|---|
| | Who's Afraid of Virginia Woolf? | Honey | |
| | Twelfth Night | Olivia | |
| | Skin Deep ad Come on Jeeves | | Gateway Theatre (Chester) |
| | Secret Garden | Martha | Leicester |
| | Spring's Awakening and Absurd Person Singular | Eva | Vienna's English Theatre |
| | The Ride Down Mount Morgan | Leah | Derby Playhouse |
| | So Long on Lonely Street | | touring |
| | The Great Gatsby | Daisy Buchanan | touring |
| | Dinner with George | | touring |
| | Home Truths | | touring |
| | A Midsummer Night's Dream | Hermia | touring |
| | Don't Look Now | Laura | touring |
| | The Trouble with Old Lovers | Alice | touring |

== Awards and nominations ==
| Year | Award | Category | Nominated work | Result |
|---|---|---|---|---|
| 2022 | British Horror Film Festival Jury Prize | Best Supporting Actress | The Wilds | Won |
