= Michael Wisher =

English actor (1935–1995)

- Wisher as Rex Farrel in the Doctor Who serial Terror of the Autons (1971)
- Born: Anthony Michael Wisher; 19 May 1935; London, England
- Died: 21 July 1995 (aged 60); Dacorum, Hertfordshire, England
- Occupation: Actor
- Years active: 1963–1995
- Known for: First actor to play Davros in Doctor Who
- Children: 1

Andrew Michael Wisher (19 May 1935 – 21 July 1995) was an English actor. He played various roles on Doctor Who and was the first actor to play the villain Davros.

== Life and career ==
Born 19 May 1935, in London, Wisher appeared in a number of television series before making his Doctor Who debut in The Seeds of Death, providing a radio voiceover. His first onscreen appearance was as John Wakefield in The Ambassadors of Death in 1970. The following year he played Rex Farrel in Terror of the Autons. In 1973, Wisher began voicing the Daleks with Frontier in Space, and in 1975 he originated the role of Dalek creator Davros in Genesis of the Daleks. He was unavailable to reprise the role in Destiny of the Daleks (1979), and Resurrection of the Daleks (1984), so was replaced by other actors. He also played Kalik in Carnival of Monsters (1973), and Morelli in Planet of Evil (1975).

Wisher also appeared in several spin-offs of Doctor Who. In 1987, Wartime, was released by Reeltime Pictures, starring John Levene in his television role as Sergeant Benton. Wisher played the ghost of Benton's father. He followed this by playing a villain with several faces in Summoned by Shadows, produced by BBV in 1991 and as a Minister in The Airzone Solution in 1993. That production included performances by four of the actors who had played the lead character in Doctor Who. Finally, he played a spaceship engineer in Shakedown: Return of the Sontarans in 1994.

Outside of Doctor Who, Wisher voiced many commercials. He narrated episodes the BBC's science series Horizon.

Wisher died of a heart attack on 21 July 1995, aged 60, in Dacorum.

== Filmography ==
Year	Title	Role	Notes
1963	Suspense	Radio officer, S.S. Opal Bay	Episode "The Uncertain Witness"
1963	Your World	Tony Miller	4 episodes
1963–1974	Z-Cars	Various	4 episodes
1965	R3	Petty Officer	Episode: "The Critical Moment"
1965	Mr. Holmes and the Lovebank	Narrator	10 radio episodes of Woman's Hour
1968	The Newcomers	Mr. Drake	2 episodes
1968–1975	Doctor Who	Radio announcer, John Wakefield, Rex Farrel, Kalik, Daleks, Davros, Magrik, Morelli	Serials: The Seeds of Death; The Ambassadors of Death; Terror of the Autons; Carnival of Monsters; Frontier in Space; Planet of the Daleks; Death to the Daleks; Genesis of the Daleks; Revenge of the Cybermen; Planet of Evil
1968–1969	Adventure Weekly	PC Cullis	10 episodes
1972	Colditz	Consulate Official	Episode: "Lord, Didn't It Rain"
1973	Moonbase 3	Harry Sanders	Episode: "Departure and Arrival"
1975	Dixon of Dock Green	PC Joe Birkett	Episode: "On a Moody Complaint"
1976	The Prince and the Pauper	Farmer	Episode 3
1976	Wilkinson's Wingle	Narrator	Writer for radio Morning Story
1982	Airline	Kellett	6 episodes
1985	Cover Her Face	Mr. Welch	Episode 2
1986	Alice in Wonderland	Cheshire Cat	2 episodes
1987	Vanity Fair	Major-domo	Episode: "A Vulgar Incident"
1988	Wartime	Benton's father	Direct-to-video film
1988	Tales of the Unexpected	Dexter	Episode: "The Dead Don't Steal"
1988	Blind Justice	Magistrates Chairman	Episode: "White Man Listen"
1989	Rules of Engagement	Surveillance Agent	Episode 3
1989	The Bill	Car Repair Man	Episode: "Chinese Whispers"
1991	The Stranger: Summoned by Shadows	Controller	Direct-to-video film
1991	EastEnders	Mr. Downing	Episode 709
1993	Doctor Who: Thirty Years in the TARDIS	Dalek voices	TV special
1993	The Airzone Solution	Richard Allenby	Direct-to-video film
1994	Shakedown: Return of the Sontarans	Robar	Direct-to-video film
1995	Dalekmania	Commissionaire	Direct-to-video film
