= P.R.O.B.E. =

Doctor Who spinoff video series

- Title card
- Created by: Mark Gatiss; Bill Baggs
- Directed by: Bill Baggs
- Starring: Caroline John; Hazel Burrows; Bill Baggs
- Theme music composer: Mark Ayres
- Country of origin: United Kingdom
- Original language: English
- No. of episodes: 5 plus 31 Case Files

Production
- Producer: Bill Baggs

Original release
- Release: January 1994 – present

Related
- Doctor Who

P.R.O.B.E. is a series of direct-to-video science-fiction films mostly written by Mark Gatiss and produced by BBV Productions. It was the first live-action Doctor Who spin-off series.

The series features Caroline John as Liz Shaw, working for the Preternatural Research Bureau. Many former Doctor Who actors, including former Doctors Jon Pertwee, Peter Davison, Colin Baker and Sylvester McCoy, appear in the series playing different roles. (Due to licensing restrictions, no overt reference to The Doctor is permitted.) Doctor Who alumna Louise Jameson co-stars with Caroline John in the original four films, as Patricia Haggard.

Originally released on VHS, the series was not widely available on video. When an interviewer commented to series author Mark Gatiss that he had never seen the series, Gatiss replied "No, and you never will. One, they're not available. And two, I forbid it. Christ, for all I knew, they were the only things I would ever get to make. And I learned a frightening amount from working on them." The four original films were released on DVD on 3 March 2012 exclusive to Galaxy 4 shop with a 12 rating.

A fifth film, written and directed by Bill Baggs, was released 20 April 2015 with Hazel Burrows taking over as Liz Shaw.

In 2020 the P.R.O.B.E. series was revived by Arcbeatle Press, starting with the release of Shadows of Doubt. Under Arcbeatle Press the series made the transition to the prose format.

== The Zero Imperative (1994) ==
1 – The Zero Imperative

Production
- Directed by: Bill Baggs
- Written by: Mark Gatiss
- Produced by: Bill Baggs
- Executive producer: Andy Grant
- Music by: Mark Ayres
- Running time: 60 minutes
- First broadcast: January 1994

The Zero Imperative was released direct-to-video in January 1994 by BBV.

=== Synopsis ===
Former UNIT luminary Liz Shaw and her assistant Bayliss are investigating a series of bizarre murders, all committed near a soon-to-be-closed psychiatric hospital. When the hospital is unexpectedly reprieved by rich Industrialist Peter Russell events seem to move out of Liz's control. Are the incumbent director of the clinic, Doctor Dove and his predecessor Doctor O'Kane harbouring the killer? What is the centuries-old horror hidden in the grounds? And what exactly is the secret of room zero?

==== Cast ====
- Liz Shaw – Caroline John
- Patricia Haggard – Louise Jameson
- Louise Bayliss – Linda Lusardi
- Dr. Jeremiah O'Kane – Jon Pertwee
- Dr. Colin Dove – Sylvester McCoy
- Peter Russell – Colin Baker
- Dr. William Bruffin – Mark Gatiss
- Patient Zero – David Terence
- Dr. Beatrice Hearst – Nicola Fulljames
- Dr. Gilchrist – Patricia Merrick
- Cummings – Jonathan Rigby
- P.R.O. – Sophie Aldred
- Orderly – Simon Messingham
- Orderly – Alexander Kirk
- Orderly – Robert John Preston
- Patient One – Peter Davison
- Daniel – Bill Baggs
- Boy's Voice – Daniel Mills

==== Trivia ====
- This film is occasionally listed as part of BBV's series The Stranger, although it is a standalone production. The only apparent connection besides production company is that Colin Baker stars in both.

== The Devil of Winterborne (1995) ==
2 – The Devil of Winterborne

Production
- Directed by: Bill Baggs
- Written by: Mark Gatiss
- Produced by: Bill Baggs
- Music by: Mark Ayres
- Running time: 80 minutes
- First broadcast: January 1995

The Devil of Winterborne was released direct-to-video in January 1995 by BBV.

=== Synopsis ===
When P.R.O.B.E. are summoned to investigate the savage murder of retired headmaster Mr. Whittaker and his dog, Liz Shaw is disturbed to find evidence of a satanic ritual near the scene of the crime. The trail leads of deceit and corruption extends to the current occupants of nearby Winterborne School, where it appears that someone is determined to cover up an ancient secret – at any cost. With another animal having bit the dust, the current headteacher accused of murdering a pupil, and one of the school's oldest employees having been stabbed with a knife, Liz finds herself under increasing pressure from all sides to produce results, especially with P.R.O.B.E. under threat from within – and the death toll mounting. However, a shocking revelation from headteacher Gavin Purcell reveals that The Devil of Winterborne is at large – and only Liz can stop it.

=== Cast ===
- Liz Shaw – Caroline John
- Patricia Haggard – Louise Jameson
- D.I. Burke – Terry Molloy
- Brian Rutherford – Geoffrey Beevers
- Mr. Wittaker – Geoffrey Beevers
- Gavin Purcell – Peter Davison
- Barbara Taploe – Charmian May
- Georgie – Mark Gatiss
- Christian – Daniel Matthews
- Andrew Powell – Reece Shearsmith
- Luke – Stephen Dolomore
- Cummings – Jonathan Rigby

== Unnatural Selection (1996) ==
3 – Unnatural Selection

Production
- Directed by: Bill Baggs
- Written by: Mark Gatiss
- Produced by: Bill Baggs
- Music by: Mark Ayres
- Running time: 47 min.
- First broadcast: October 1996

Unnatural Selection was released direct-to-video in October 1996 by BBV.

=== Synopsis ===
In 1975, the British Government quietly closed down a secret evolutionary project codenamed BEAGLE, ordering the destruction of all research materials. Today, the horrific discovery of several oddly mutated bodies alerts Liz Shaw and P.R.O.B.E. to the fact that something is stalking the original site of project BEAGLE – something which may challenge the very nature of humanity itself! With a crack security team at her disposal, Liz desperately attempts to track down the perverted results of the project. But who or what is hunting whom?

=== Cast ===
- Liz Shaw – Caroline John
- Patricia Haggard – Louise Jameson
- Julius Quilter – Charles Kay
- Brian Rutherford – Geoffrey Beevers
- Soldier – Stephen Bradshaw
- Soldier – Keith Brooks
- Alfred Emerson – Mark Gatiss
- Col. Ackroyd – Alexander Kirk
- Dr. Gilchrist – Patricia Merrick
- Soldier – Mark Moore
- Security Guard – George Murphy
- Soldier – Gabriel Mykaj
- Clare – Zoe Randall
- Angela – Kathryn Rayner
- Cummings – Jonathan Rigby
- Dr. Dennis Lancaster – Simon Wolfe

== Ghosts of Winterborne (1996) ==
4 – Ghosts of Winterborne

Production
- Directed by: Bill Baggs
- Written by: Mark Gatiss
- Produced by: Bill Baggs
- Music by: Mark Ayres
- Running time: 42 min.
- First broadcast: November 1996

Ghosts of Winterborne was released direct-to-video in November 1996 by BBV.

=== Synopsis ===
The Devil of Winterborne has only recently been exorcised by P.R.O.B.E. But when the body of its last victim disappears, and a book of black magic spells is stolen from a local museum, Liz Shaw begins to wonder if the ghosts of the past have really been laid to rest. Forced into an unholy alliance with the school's disgraced headmaster, Liz must fight not only her own warring emotions, but a festering evil that threatens to corrupt the Earth again after 100 years. But how do you fight a shadow from hell?

=== Cast ===
- Liz Shaw – Caroline John
- Patricia Haggard – Louise Jameson
- Gavin Purcell – Peter Davison
- Christian – Daniel Matthews
- Margaret Wyndham – Charmian May
- Andrew Powell – Reece Shearsmith
- Max – David Hankinson
- Ian – Nathan Hamlett
- Librarian – Alan Nicholas

=== Story notes ===
- The end credits list Mrs. Wyndham's first name as Barbara, rather than her on-screen name of Margaret. However, Mrs. Wyndham's deceased twin sister, Ms. Taploe, was also named Barbara.
- Until the release of Zygon: When Being You Just Isn't Enough in 2007, this was the only Doctor Who-related product to be given an 18 certificate. (In 2012, it was re-rated 12.)

== When to Die (2015) ==
5 – When to Die

Production
- Directed by: Bill Baggs
- Written by: Bill Baggs
- Produced by: Bill Baggs
- Music by: Olivia Thomas
- Running time: 63 min.
- First broadcast: 20 April 2015

When to Die was released direct-to-video on 20 April 2015 by BBV.

=== Synopsis ===
Liz investigates the government execution of an immortal Corporal who 'no longer has a use'.

=== Cast ===
- Liz Shaw – Hazel Burrows
- Patricia Haggard – Georgette Ellison
- Giles – Bill Baggs
- Secretary of State for Defence – Matthew Ellison
- Security Guard – Danni Fletcher
- Josie Williams – Clare Groome
- Receptionist – Kathrina Gwynne
- Major Johnson – Neil Gwynne
- Charlie Reynish – Ken Hann
- Bennett – Marcus Kinsella
- Soldier – Ruben Sanchez
- Bosnian Diplomat – Brian Stansbridge
- Corporal 7891Alpha – Peter Ward

== Shadows of Doubt (2020) ==
6 – Shadows of Doubt

Production
- Written by: Hunter O'Connell, James Wylder, James Hornby
- Running time: 3 minutes
- First broadcast: 28 April 2020

Shadows of Doubt was released on YouTube on 28 April 2020 by Arcbeatle Press.

=== Synopsis ===
Giles fears for his team in light of the upcoming perihelion.

=== Cast ===
- Giles – Bill Baggs

== Case Files (2021–present) ==
Case Files
- Written by: James Hornby & Bill Baggs
- No. of seasons: 3
- No. of episodes: 28

Production
- Producer: Bill Baggs

Original release
- Network: YouTube
- Release: 22 January 2021 – present

Case Files is a series of video diaries initially released on YouTube under the initial title P.R.O.B.E. Online starting 22 January 2021 by BBV Productions, later released exclusively to the BBV Productions website.

=== Episodes ===
Presented as Case File video-diary entries by main character Giles, often including illustrations and references to various Doctor Who-related media. On 16 April 2021, episodes became available on the official BBV website & on DVD 10 June 2021. This lists ordered per the DVD releases.

==== Volume 1 ====
Case file	Title	Written by	Release date
1	"First Entry"	James Hornby	10 June 2021
2	"Kelpie"	James Hornby	10 June 2021
3	"Peckham Poltergeist"	James Hornby	12 February 2021
Giles and Archie investigate a home haunting.
4	"Manchester"	James Hornby	5 February 2021
Giles struggles to come to terms with the death of PROBE agent Archie MacTavish.
5	"Stacey Facade"	James Hornby	22 January 2021
Giles finds love, but not all is as it seems.
6	"Shadow People"	James Hornby	26 February 2021
Giles and the PROBE team are stalked by mysterious beings.
7	"Varunastra"	James Hornby	12 March 2021
Giles contends with a mythological weapon.
8	"Doctor X"	James Hornby	26 March 2021
Giles recovers a lost episode of 1950s television series Doctor X. Originally created by author Iain McLaughlin.
9	"Goo!"	Bill Baggs	21 April 2021
Giles and Liz investigate a conspiracy behind the global lockdown.
10	"Sherwood Sorceress"	James Hornby	24 April 2021
Giles helps Liz save a kidnapped child.

==== Out of the Shadows ====
Case file	Title	Written by	Release date
N/A	"Out of the Shadows"	James Hornby	10 October 2021
Released on Arcbeatle Press's YouTube channel

==== Volume 2 ====
Case file	Title	Written by	Release date
11	"A Message From Sir Andrew"	TBD	February 2022
12	"Daylight Savings"	James Hornby	6 June 2021
Crossover with the Faction Paradox line of spinoffs.
13	"Ichor"	Bill Baggs	5 July 2021
Giles contends with the blood of the Gods.
14	"Out of the Shadows of Doubt"	James Hornby, Hunter O'Connell, James Wylder & Lucy Wood-Ives from an initial concept by Aristide Twain	February 2022
15	"Fog"	Bill Baggs	6 July 2021
Giles meets a curious alien prisoner.
16	"Lauren Anderson"	James Hornby & Bill Baggs	7 July 2021
Giles tangles with shapeshifters.
17	"Living Fiction"	Warren Lewis	8 July 2021
A mysterious film-reel is analysed by PROBE, proving to be very complex & deadly.
18	"The Only Cure"	James Hornby	February 2022
19	"Ex-President"	James Hornby	February 2022
20	"Legend"	James Hornby	February 2022
Crossover with BBV's Brigadier series.

==== Volume 3 ====
Case file	Title	Written by	Release date
21	"Maxie Masters"	Bill Baggs	March 2022
22	"O'Kane"	Bill Baggs	1 January 2023
23	"Mist Mystery"	Bill Baggs	1 February 2023
24	"Stranger"	Bill Baggs	1 March 2023
Crossover with BBV's The Stranger franchise.
25	"Erlik"	Bill Baggs	28 April 2023
26	"St. Swithun"	Bill Baggs	24 February 2024
27	"Bridge"	Bill Baggs & Warren Lewis	22 March 2024
28	"For The Hell Of It!"	Bill Baggs	22 April 2024

==== Mission: Find Lilith ====
Case file	Title	Written by	Release date
N/A	"Mission: Find Lilith"	Trevor Spencer	8 November 2023
Released on BBV's TikTok and YouTube channels as part of the Hellscape series.

==== Volume 4 ====
Case file	Title	Written by	Release date
29	"Portents of Doom"	Chris McAuley & Bill Baggs	3 October 2024
30	"Deadwood"	Elliott B. Parmelee & Bill Baggs	24 April 2025
31	"Mia"	Leopold Agnew	25 August 2025

=== Cast ===
- Giles X – Bill Baggs
- Liz Shaw – Hazel Burrows, archive footage of Caroline John
- Sir. Andrew Williams – Simon Fisher-Becker
- Detective Inspector Gemma – Kate Grundy-Garcia
- Ash Ogden – Sam Hussey
- Minister Jefferson – Jill Desborough
- Mia – Kelly Soar
- Solomon – Colin Baker (archive footage)/ Simon White
- Miss Brown – Nicola Bryant (archive footage)
- Lucifer – Trevor Spencer
- Dr. Lauren Anderson – Jo Castleton (archive footage)
- Dr. Jeremiah O'Kane – Jon Pertwee (archive footage)
- Andrew Powell – Reece Shearsmith (archive footage)
- Alfred Emerson – Mark Gatiss (archive footage)

=== Crew ===
- Written by James Hornby & Bill Baggs
- Script Editor: Lucy Wood-Ives & James Hornby
- CG FX by James Lee
- Graphics by Warren Lewis
- PROBE Theme: Mark Ayres
- PROBE Logo: Lucas Kovacs
- Editing/ Post-Production: Bill Baggs & Callum Brown

== Audiobooks (2021–present) ==
P.R.O.B.E. Audiobooks

Cast
- Starring Bill Baggs (reader)

Production
- Written by: James Hornby & James Wylder
- Produced by: Bill Baggs
- Running time: approx 40 minutes
- First broadcast: 8 May 2021

P.R.O.B.E. Audiobooks are a series of narrated short stories released on the BBV Productions website.

Audiobook	Title	Written by	Release date
1	The Door We Forgot	James Hornby & James Wylder	7 May 2021
A free streaming/download version of this story read by Aubrey Guest was released by Arcbeatle Press 5 May 2020.
2	9 to 5	James Hornby	14 May 2021
3	She Came From Another World!	James Wylder	17 June 2021
4	What Happened in Manchester	James Hornby	25 July 2021
5	Broken Bonds	James Hornby	3 October 2021
6	Silver-Tongued Liars	James Wylder	15 January 2022
7	A Worthy Successor	James Hornby & James Wylder	14 June 2021
8	New Companions: Maxie	Bill Baggs	4 February 2022
9	New Companions: Sam Myers	Trevor Spencer	9 June 2022
10	Giles: The Beginning	Bill Baggs	8 August 2022
11	First Case	Bill Baggs	19 December 2022
12	Bold	Bill Baggs	26 December 2022
13	Guardian At The Gate	Chris McAuley	29 March 2023
14	The Liz Shaw Files: Honeymoon	Trevor Spencer	7 July 2025

== Short stories ==
Short prose stories published by Arcbeatle Press

- "The Door We Forgot" (by James Hornby and James Wylder, 5 May 2020)
- "She Came From Another World!" (by James Wylder, 8 August 2020)

=== Anthologies ===
- Out of the Shadows (ed James Hornby & Genevieve Clovis, 12 October 2021)
  - "Prologue" (James Wylder)
  - "Preternatural Days" (James Hornby)
  - "There, but Not Seen" (Kylie Leane)
  - "The 262" (Stuart Douglas)
  - "How To Appear Human In Several Uneasy Lessons" (John Peel)
  - "A Honeycomb of Souls" (James Wylder)
  - "The Last Few Pages" (Hunter O'Connell)
  - "The One That Got Away" (Steve Lyons)
  - "The Forest in the Fog" (E Southern)
  - "Nowhere Women" (James Wylder)
  - "What Lurks in the Shadows" (James Hornby)
  - "Out of the Box" (Aristide Twain)
  - "Preternatural Nights" (James Hornby)
- True Origins (ed James Hornby & Jame Wyler, 8 January 2022)
  - "Silver-Tongued Liars" (James Wylder)
  - "A Worthy Successor" (James Hornby & James Wylder)
  - "She Came From Another World!" (James Wylder)
  - "9 to 5" (James Hornby)
  - "What Happened in Manchester" (James Hornby)
  - "The Door We Forgot" (James Wylder)
  - "Broken Bonds" (James Hornby)
  - "The Blue Scream of Death" (Tyche McPhee Letts)

== Reception ==
A Doctor Who Magazine review of the 1990s films was critical of Caroline John's performance, as well as how her character was filmed. It described The Devil of Winterborne as "well paced, interesting and immediately enjoyable" but was more critical of Unnatural Selection and The Ghosts of Winterborne. It concluded that while the series "has great potential", Devil "treats its audience with a great deal more respect than its successors, which among all the other blood, guts and offal, contain an unacceptably large portion of tripe."

Digital Spy is critical of When to Die, calling it "a pale shadow of its predecessors" and arguing that Burrows was not suited to the role of Shaw.
