= Nicholas Briggs =

English actor, writer and director (born 1961)

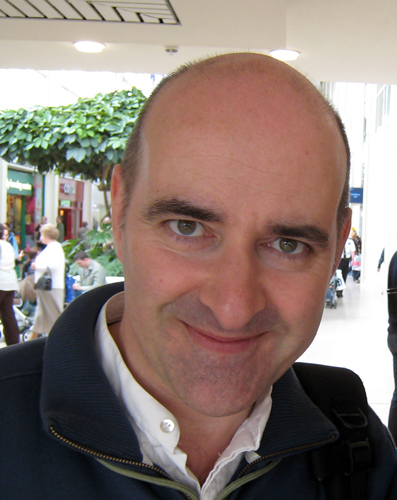
- Briggs in 2008
- Born: 29 September 1961 (age 65); Lyndhurst, Hampshire, England
- Education: Rose Bruford College
- Occupations: Actor; writer; director; sound designer; composer
- Years active: 1985–present
- Known for: Voice of the Daleks and the Cybermen in Doctor Who since 2005
- Children: 1
- Website: nicholasbriggs.com

Nicholas Briggs (born 29 September 1961) is an English actor, writer, director, sound designer and composer. He is known for voicing the Daleks and Cybermen in the BBC science fiction series Doctor Who (2005–present) and for serving as executive producer of Big Finish Productions since 2006, for which he has written, directed and produced licensed Doctor Who audio dramas.

A lifelong Doctor Who fan, Briggs first came to prominence through his involvement in the fan-produced audio drama series Audio Visuals (1985–1991) and various direct-to-video Doctor Who spin-offs. He joined Big Finish in the late 1990s as one of its founding creative figures. Briggs voiced the Daleks in Big Finish's licensed Doctor Who audio dramas and was subsequently cast in the same role when the television series was revived in 2005. He also appeared on screen in the BBC Doctor Who productions Torchwood (2009), An Adventure in Space and Time (2013) and The Five(ish) Doctors Reboot (2013).

Beyond Doctor Who productions, Briggs directed the BBC Radio 4 comedy Nebulous (2005–2008) and an audio drama adaptation of The Prisoner (2016–2017). He appeared in Noel Clarke's films Adulthood (2008) and 4.3.2.1. (2010). Since 2010, he has frequently portrayed Sherlock Holmes in stage and audio productions.

== Early life and education ==
Briggs was born in Lyndhurst, Hampshire on 29 September 1961 and grew up in a housing estate in Totton. He described his upbringing as having a "working-class mentality". His father worked in the car industry and his mother was a secretary. His older brother Colin was a broadcaster who presented BBC Look North for two decades.

Briggs' first public acting role was in the Nativity musical Follow the Star in his final year of school. He went on to technical college to take his A-levels and a drama diploma. He studied at Rose Bruford College with Barry Killerby, known for portraying Mr Blobby. Briggs graduated in 1983 with a degree in theatre arts.

== Career ==
=== 1985–1997: Early Doctor Who spin-offs ===
Briggs grew up fascinated by the BBC science fiction television series Doctor Who. He did not immediately find acting work following his graduation, so he became involved with a group of fans who produced not-for-profit unlicensed Doctor Who audio dramas called the Audio Visuals. (Note: Attributed to multiple sources) Fueled by Doctor Who's 1985 hiatus, four seasons were released between 1985 and 1991. Briggs played the Doctor in all but the first Audio Visuals release, which starred Stephen Payne, and also wrote, directed, composed and sound designed many of them under pseudonyms such as Arthur Wallis, Samuel Flint and Erica Galloway. The Audio Visuals were highly popular with fans and circulated amongst fan clubs in the 1980s. Brigg's incarnation of the Doctor appeared in licensed comics published in Doctor Who Magazine: in the 1991 comic story "Party Animals", and later as the supposed "Ninth Doctor" in a 1998 storyline where the Eighth Doctor seemingly regenerated.

From 1985, Briggs hosted Myth Makers, a series of direct-to-video documentaries produced by Reeltime Pictures, in which he interviewed various cast and crew members of Doctor Who. According to Briggs, "Myth Makers gave me an outlet for performance that I wasn’t getting otherwise." He also appeared in the Blade Runner parody Myth Runner as a private detective on the run from his android double—the storyline was a framing device to showcase bloopers from the Myth Makers series. Briggs also appeared in Reeltime's direct-to-video film Wartime (1987), the first independently-produced licensed Doctor Who spin-off.

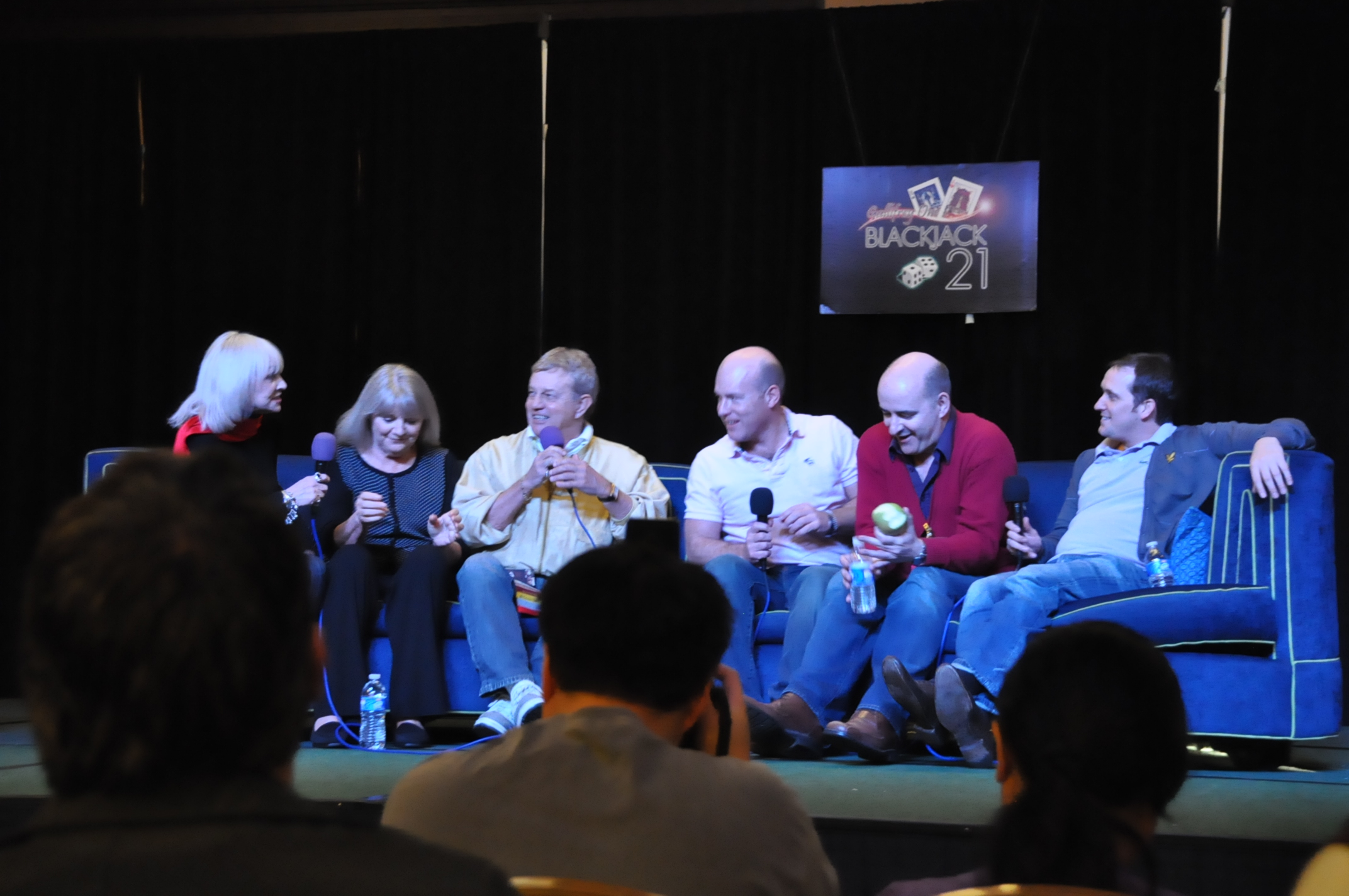
Briggs (second from right) with Doctor Who cast members in 2010

Briggs performed occasionally in London fringe theatre, before becoming an editorial assistant at the publishing company Visual Imagination in 1988, working on the magazines Starburst and TV Zone. In 1995, he became editor of the magazine Film Review. Briggs continued to work on fan productions, writing various direct-to-video science fiction films produced by BBV Productions, which were inspired by Doctor Who and featured actors from the series. He wrote four films in The Stranger series (1993–1995) starring Colin Baker as an ersatz version of the Doctor. Briggs also wrote The Airzone Solution (1993), which starred former Doctor Who leads Jon Pertwee, Peter Davison, Colin Baker and Sylvester McCoy. For BBV, Briggs played an amnesiac version of his incarnation of the Doctor in the audio dramas "Cyber Hunt" (1998) and "Vital Signs" (1999).

Briggs directed the direct-to-video film Stranger than Fiction (1994), a behind-the-scenes documentary about BBV productions. He also wrote for the Channel 5 soap opera Family Affairs in the late 1990s. Briggs wrote the Auton trilogy (1997–1999), a direct-to-video film series which licensed the Autons from the estate of their creator Robert Holmes. On the Auton films, Briggs stated "they are by no means perfect, in fact they're horribly flawed. But I wrote and directed both of them under fairly impossible budgetary and time constraints, with a lovely team of actors".

=== 1999–2002: Early Big Finish years ===
The Audio Visuals team, which included Gary Russell and Jason Haigh-Ellary, began working under the banner of Haigh-Ellary's production company Big Finish Productions. In 1998, Big Finish, having obtained a license from Virgin Publishing, began producing audio dramas centered on the Doctor Who spin-off character Bernice Summerfield. Briggs directed many episodes of the series. (Note: Attributed to multiple sources) Later the same year, Big Finish obtained a license for Doctor Who from the BBC, allowing them to officially produce audio dramas based on the series. Briggs and Russell convened a meeting with several writers to present their plans for Big Finish and invite pitches for new audio dramas. The meeting was contentious, with almost every writer objecting to Briggs being selected to write the company's debut Doctor Who drama. Undeterred, Briggs wrote and directed The Sirens of Time (1999), the first of Big Finish's monthly Doctor Who: Main Range series. Some of Briggs' Audio Visuals dramas were adapted into licensed Doctor Who dramas, such as Sword of Orion (2001).

Briggs voiced the Daleks—the xenophobic alien race considered Doctor Who's most iconic monsters—in Big Finish's audio dramas. Briggs stated that his performance draws "on all the greats of the past, like [previous Dalek performers] Peter Hawkins, David Graham, Roy Skelton and Michael Wisher", though his favourite is Hawkins.

As a kid, I was always trying to impersonate [the Dalek voice], and fiddling around with tape recorders, and screaming into microphones – not really understanding what went into making the actual electronic noise. Then, in 1999, I was involved with the creation of the Doctor Who audio adventures from Big Finish, and soon after we started we got an agreement from the Terry Nation estate to do Dalek stories. I was trained as an actor AND had that entire childhood of making Dalek noises behind me, and I said to the producer at the time, "Will it be alright for me to do the Dalek voices, or do you want to see a grown man cry?" Everyone seemed to like it, no one said, "Oh, this doesn't sound like a Dalek", quite the opposite.

— Briggs in 2016

At Big Finish, Briggs wrote and directed four series of Dalek Empire, a Dalek-centered spinoff. He co-wrote the 2002 Doctor Who book The Dalek Survival Guide. Briggs voiced the Cyber-Controller and Professor Osborn in the webcast audio series Real Time (2002).

Briggs continued to act on stage. He played Sherlock Holmes in London fringe theatre, and also directed a provincial production of Noël Coward's play Private Lives. Briggs acted in the comedy series The League of Gentlemen (2002).

=== 2003–2013: Televised Doctor Who and executive producer of Big Finish ===
A revived series of Doctor Who entered development in 2003. In a 2003 Doctor Who Magazine article, Briggs detailed the technology behind the Dalek voice, such as the Moogerfooger and the ring modulator. This article, as well as Briggs's previous performances as the Daleks on audio, led Doctor Who's new executive producer Russell T Davies to cast Briggs as the voice of the Daleks on television.

"[Davies] had me in mind from the moment he'd decided he was bringing the Daleks back – not just because he thought I was good at doing Dalek voices, but because he was aware that I had the technical know-how to recreate them... In the absence of a BBC Radiophonic Workshop, I was the sort of total solution."

— Briggs in 2019

Briggs has voiced the Daleks in the revived series since their debut in "Dalek" (2005). He typically performs the Dalek voice on-set during production. Briggs also voiced a Dalek in a 2004 episode of Coupling written by future Doctor Who showrunner Steven Moffat.

Briggs has voiced the Cybermen since their debut in the revived series in "Rise of the Cybermen" (2006). Other vocal roles include the Nestene Consciousness in "Rose" (2005), the Ice Warrior Skaldak in "Cold War" (2013), and the Judoon in both Doctor Who and its spin-off series The Sarah Jane Adventures. Briggs has also performed many of the monsters' voices for toys, video games and promotional events.

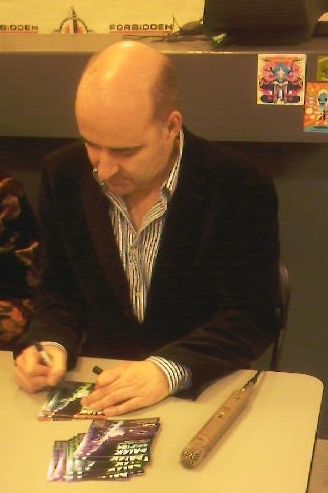
Briggs signing autographs in 2008

Briggs directed all three series of the BBC Radio 4 science fiction comedy Nebulous (2005–2008).

In 2006, Briggs replaced Gary Russell as executive producer of Big Finish. He wrote and directed the Big Finish audio drama series Cyberman (2005–2009). In 2007, he guest starred in the Sapphire and Steel audio drama Water Like a Stone. Briggs voiced the Daleks in a 2007 charity theatre production of The Daleks' Master Plan (1965–1966) at New Theatre Royal. In 2007, he appeared with his Doctor Who cast members in a themed episode of the game show The Weakest Link.

Briggs appeared in Noel Clarke's crime drama film Adulthood (2008). In 2008, Briggs played Sherlock Holmes in Holmes and the Ripper by Brian Clemens at Theatre Royal, Nottingham. The following year he played Holmes in The Hound of the Baskervilles, which he adapted.

Briggs appeared in the television series Lewis (2009). He made his first physical appearance in a BBC Doctor Who production when he played parliamentary adviser Rick Yates in the 2009 Torchwood serial Children of Earth. According to Briggs, Davies recommended Briggs to Torchwood's casting director, as he was leaving Doctor Who and regretted never giving Briggs an on-screen part in the series. In 2010, Briggs played Winston Churchill in the stage show Doctor Who Live and appeared in Clarke's film 4.3.2.1.

Briggs has played Sherlock Holmes in Big Finish audio dramas since 2010, which include adaptations of Arthur Conan Doyle stories as well as original stories. Richard Earl co-stars as Dr. Watson. Briggs has played Count Dracula at Theatre Royal from 2010. Briggs regularly presented BBC Radio 4 Extra's daily science fiction segment Seventh Dimension since 2010.

Briggs's licensed Doctor Who novel The Dalek Generation was published in 2012. Briggs wrote and directed the first series of the Doctor Who audio drama Dark Eyes (2012), which won the 2014 Audio Drama Award for Best Online or Non-Broadcast Drama. In 2012, Briggs played Sherlock Holmes in the touring production Sherlock Holmes - A Study in Fear, an adaptation of "The Final Problem".

=== 2013–present: Later career ===
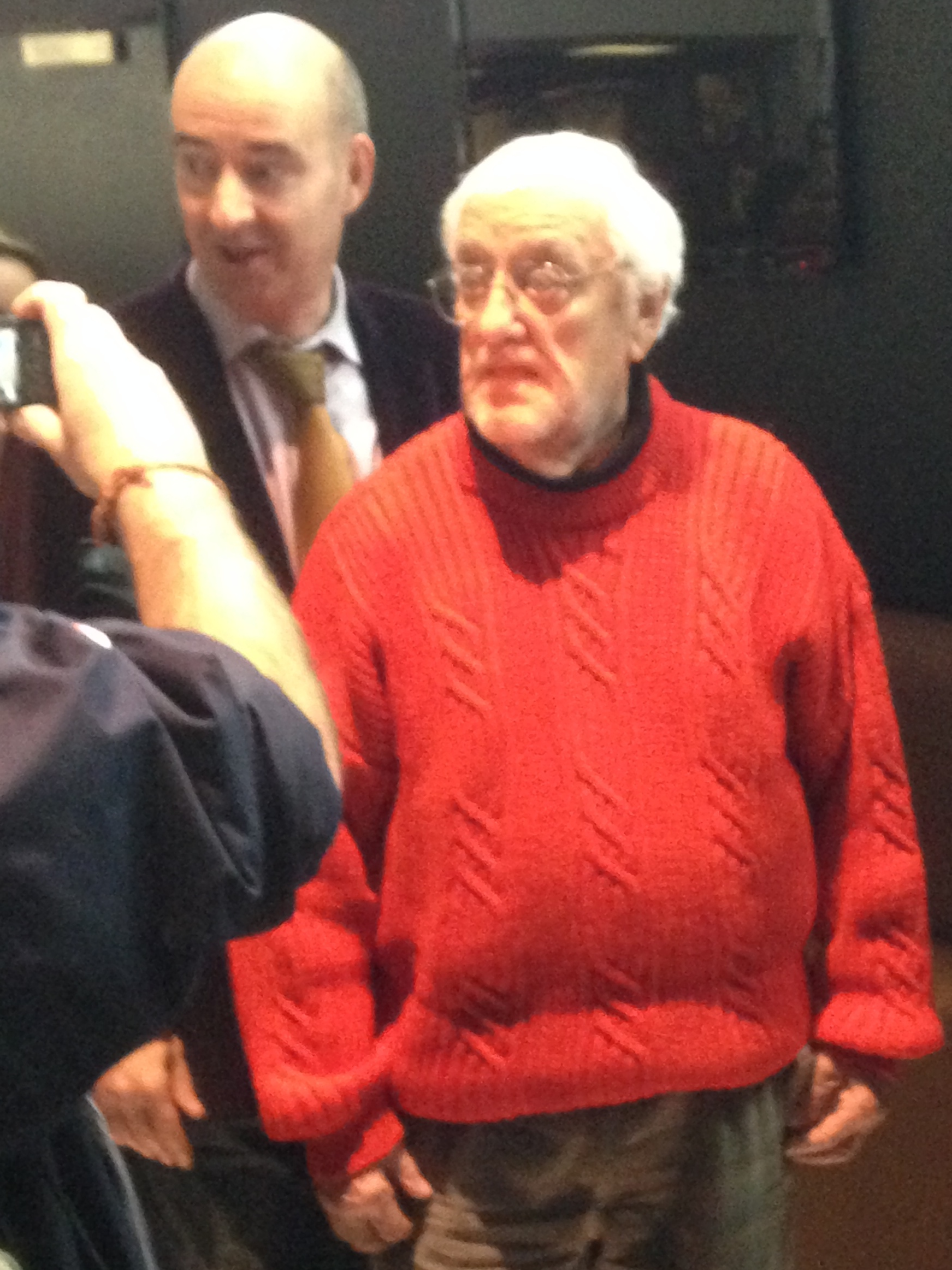
Briggs with Bernard Cribbins at the Doctor Who 50th Anniversary Celebration Weekend in 2013

In 2013, Briggs was involved in various licensed productions which celebrated Doctor Who's 50th anniversary. He wrote and directed the commemorative Big Finish audio drama The Light at the End. He portrayed Peter Hawkins in the biographical television film An Adventure in Space and Time, which depicts the production of Doctor Who from 1963 to 1966. He also made a cameo appearance as a Dalek operator in the comedy short film The Five(ish) Doctors Reboot, directed by Peter Davison.

Briggs voiced Anforth and Metatron in a 2014 audio adaptation of the fantasy novel Good Omens. Briggs pre-recorded a short cameo as the Daleks for the live podcast stage show 50 Years of Doctor Who: Preachrs Podcast Live 2! (2014).

After Briggs became executive producer of Big Finish, he subsequently "nudged the BBC... very regularly" about obtaining a licence to produce audio dramas based on the revived series of Doctor Who. When AudioGo, which had been producing audiobooks based on the revived series, went into administration in 2013, Briggs "kind of [went] hell for leather to get it sorted out". Big Finish received the licence in 2015.

In 2016, Briggs directed a touring stage adaptation of Strange Case of Dr Jekyll and Mr Hyde. Briggs wrote and directed a Big Finish audio drama series adaptation of The Prisoner (2016–2017).

Briggs co-hosts The Big Finish Podcast, a promotional podcast for Big Finish Productions, with Benji Clifford. Briggs and Clifford co-hosted The Benji and Nick show, a podcast about cult television shows, until September 2021.

Briggs voiced Nyder, Davros's assistant originated by Peter Miles, in the 2023 Doctor Who minisode Destination: Skaro.

== Personal life ==
As of 2017, Briggs lives in Dorset with his wife Stephanie Hornett and son.

== Bibliography ==
- Doctor Who (in Doctor Who Magazine #218–220, 1994)
- The Dalek Survival Guide (ISBN 0-563-48600-7, published by BBC Books 2002)
- The Dalek Generation (2012)
