= Nestene Consciousness and Autons =

Fictional aliens from the Doctor Who franchise

- Doctor Who race
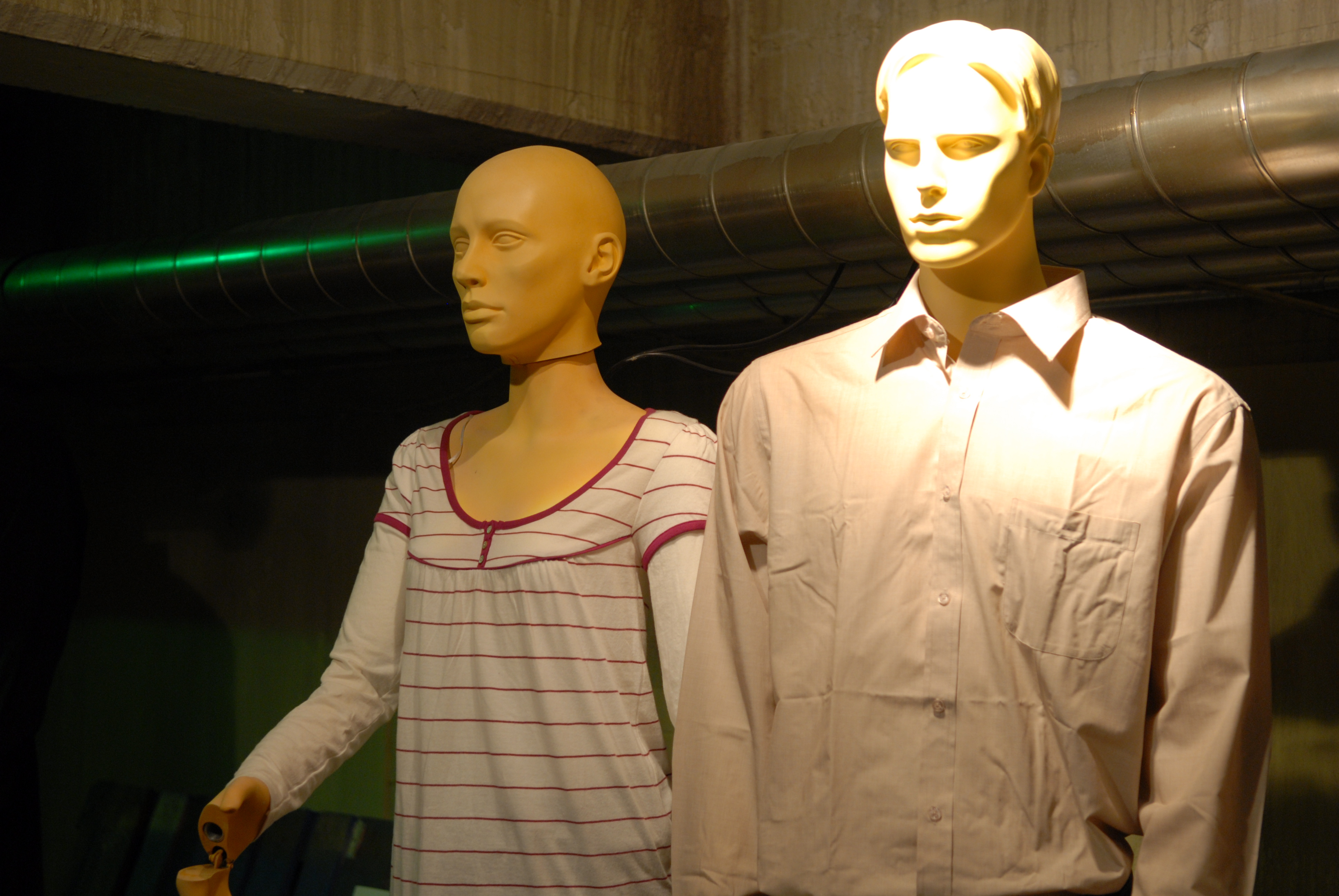
- A pair of Autons, as they appear in "Rose", on display at the Doctor Who Experience
- First appearance: Spearhead from Space (1970)
- Created by: Robert Holmes

In-universe information
- Type: Non-corporeal entity (Nestene Consciousness); Living plastic automata (Autons)

The Nestene Consciousness and the Autons are antagonists from the British science fiction television series Doctor Who. They were originally created by scriptwriter Robert Holmes for the serial Spearhead from Space (1970). The Nestene Consciousness is a non-corporeal entity that has the ability to control plastic. The Autons are mannequins animated by the Consciousness, used as its footsoldiers. Following their debut, the Nestenes and Autons re-appeared in the 1971 serial Terror of the Autons, as well as in the show's 2005 revival in the episodes "Rose" (2005), "The Pandorica Opens", and "The Big Bang" (both 2010).

While brainstorming concepts for the new, entirely earthbound format for the 1970 season of the show, the team decided on an alien invasion from a non-corporeal entity that could split into parts; following discussions about plastic and the potential terror that lay in mannequins coming to life, it was decided to make the entity capable of controlling plastic, resulting in the creation of the Nestene and its Auton minions. The Nestene would go on to re-appear in Terror of the Autons as a result of the popularity of the prior serial. Though another re-appearance was planned for both the 1983 serial "The Five Doctors" and the 1986 season of the show, both of these were scrapped in production. Their usage in "Rose" was done, alongside several other reasons, in order to ensure the titular character, Rose Tyler, would not immediately assume the Autons were aliens, which was important in the episode's narrative.

The Autons have been considered one of the more popular monsters in the series. A scene from Spearhead from Space in which they emerge from shop windows and attack passersby has been cited as one of the show's most famous scenes. The Autons were regarded as some of the scariest monsters in the show's history, with their appearance in Terror of the Autons drawing criticism as a result.

== Appearances ==
Doctor Who is a long-running British science-fiction television series that began in 1963. It stars its protagonist, The Doctor, an alien who travels through time and space in a ship known as the TARDIS, as well as their travelling companions. When the Doctor dies, they can undergo a process known as "regeneration", completely changing the Doctor's appearance and personality. Throughout their travels, the Doctor often comes into conflict with various alien species and antagonists. The Nestene Consciousness is a formless, non-corporeal entity that possesses the ability to control and manipulate plastic. The Autons are living plastic mannequins, which the Nestene uses as its footsoldiers, with Autons having guns built into their hands in order to attack.

The Third Doctor, as portrayed by actor Jon Pertwee, being strangled by tentacles from the Nestene Consciousness. This squid-like form would be used as its main appearance in spin-off media until the show's revival, where it is portrayed as a blob-like creature.

The Nestene Consciousness and the Autons first appeared in 1970's Spearhead from Space, where the Nestene attempts to invade the Earth. The Nestene manipulate plastic replicas of humans called Autons to do its bidding. The Third Doctor, when confronting the Nestene, is attacked by a plastic, tentacled form used by the creature, but his companion Liz Shaw is able to shut down the Consciousness, rendering the Autons inert and thwarting the invasion. The Nestenes later attempt invasion again in the 1971 serial Terror of the Autons, where they team up with the Master, another enemy of the Doctor, to invade the planet. The Nestenes use various plastic objects to aid in the invasion, but are thwarted when the Doctor is able to convince the Master that the Nestenes will betray the Master after Earth is secured. The Master then teams up with the Doctor to send the Nestenes back into space.

The Nestene Consciousness did not appear on-screen again until 2005's "Rose", the first episode of the series' revival. The Nestene Consciousness, crippled by the Time War, a massive interstellar conflict, again attempt to invade Earth to take advantage of the pollutants on the planet. It invades Earth using Autons, with the London Eye acting as its base of operations. The Ninth Doctor's companion Rose Tyler is able to knock a vial of "anti-plastic" into the Consciousness, killing the creature and stopping the invasion.

The Nestene Consciousness next appeared in 2010 episodes "The Pandorica Opens" and "The Big Bang". When the Eleventh Doctor travels to the time of the Romans to find a prison named the Pandorica, an alliance of his enemies arrive to stop him, including the Consciousness. It uses plastic Auton duplicates of a Roman legion, constructed from the memories of a picture book read by the Doctor's companion Amy Pond, in order to trick and trap the Doctor inside of the Pandorica. After reality is destroyed due to the destruction of the TARDIS at the hands of the Silence, the Nestene Consciousness and Autons are erased from existence, barring an Auton duplicate of Amy's fiance Rory Williams, who is able to survive the erasure. The duplicate of Rory would aid the Doctor in restoring the established universe. Following the restoration of the universe, Rory was restored to normal, and the Consciousness's involvement with the alliance never occurred.

=== Spin-off media ===
The Autons and Nestenes appeared in a trilogy of unofficial films produced by BBV Productions in the 1990s, dubbed the Auton trilogy. Dylan Rees, in the book Downtime - The Lost Years of Doctor Who, praised the first two films but criticised the third. A novelisation of the first film written by David Black was published in early 2022.

The Nestenes and Autons have also appeared in a variety of books, comic strips, and audio dramas produced for the series, with the latter including a spin-off audio drama series starring Rory's Auton duplicate during the events of "The Big Bang". During 2020, as part of a fan "Watch-along" of the episode "Rose," writer Russell T Davies wrote a sequel to the episode "Rose" entitled "Revenge of the Nestene." It depicts a surviving Auton after the events of the episode.

== Conception and design ==
=== Classic series ===
Drawing on the ideas of the Quatermass serials, producer Peter Bryant and producer and script editor Derrick Sherwin decided that for the series' seventh season, the show's protagonist the Doctor should be restricted to contemporary Earth and work alongside the UNIT organisation, featured prominently in the sixth season's serial The Invasion. Producer Barry Letts and script editor Terrance Dicks, inheriting this new vision for the series, also wanted their stories for the seventh season to have a serious, deeper subtext.

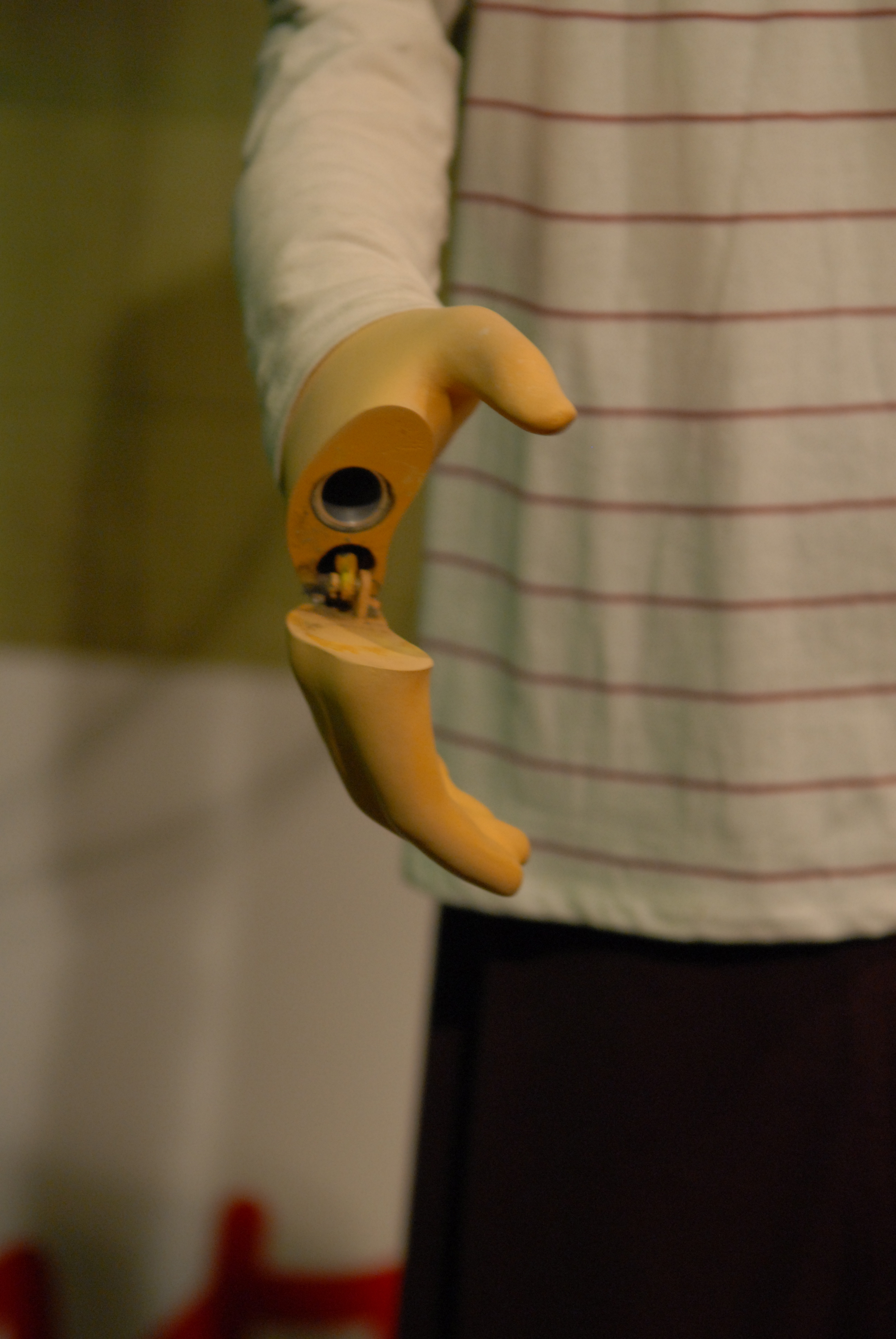
An Auton weapon in the show's revival, as shown at the Doctor Who Experience

The new format was believed to have potential for new "alien invasion" stories, and writer Robert Holmes conceived of a formless intelligence that travelled in segments. Sherwin, while on a walk, was struck by the "sinister nature" of mannequins, and the production team decided that these mannequins coming to life and replacing humans was a scary concept that could be utilised. Sherwin was also inspired by a visit to a children's doll factory. Holmes created the idea of the creature having an affinity for plastic, and created the idea of the formless intelligence, which would become the Nestene Consciousness, being a "glob of instinct in the form of plastic." This serial eventually emerged as Spearhead from Space.

The Autons, for this serial, were performed by several actors. Plastic masks masked the actors' faces, with cheap nylon wigs and clothes being used to cover up the rest of the actors. Two sets of clothes were used per actor to make the number of Autons appear larger than they actually were. The clothes also covered up the source of the hand prop, which was used to simulate the Autons' hands splitting open to reveal a gun. Actors could control the hand prop using a mechanism, which allowed the tube of the gun to push out of the hand, with a small explosive charge contained inside to simulate the weapon firing. Scenes of Autons emerging from shop windows and firing on passerby were filmed on location in a London high street.

The Autons' return in Terror of the Autons was done due to the success of Spearhead, with the production team requesting Holmes write a sequel. Though Holmes disliked bringing back an old enemy, as well as the Earthbound restrictions of the stories, he obliged. Several other concepts, such as the fear of choking on plastic bags, were adapted into the serial, with the plastic bags adapted as a plastic film that would fire out of plastic daffodils. Other plastic products of the time, such as a chair and an ugly doll, were also used as weapons by the Nestenes. Though new masks were constructed for the Autons in this serial, the weapon props were retained and reused.

The Autons were planned to appear in the 20th anniversary special "The Five Doctors" (1983) but were scrapped due to pacing and cost issues. The Autons were also planned to appear in a serial dubbed Yellow Fever and How to Cure It for the 1986 season of the show. This would have potentially featured the Master, as well as antagonist the Rani and supporting character Brigadier Lethbridge-Stewart, involved in an Auton plot in Singapore. The script was never finished, and was scrapped in favor of The Trial of a Time Lord.

During the 1990s, following the show's cancellation, fan Bill Baggs founded the company BBV Productions, which produced unofficial Doctor Who films. Though Baggs couldn't obtain the rights to the show, he could obtain the rights to a number of the show's characters, who were held under the copyright of their creators rather than that of the BBC. Thus, many productions made by BBV focused on old enemies of the Doctor confronting original characters, with several of these films focusing on the Autons. Written and directed by Nicholas Briggs, these Auton films were considered some of the best unofficial productions using characters from the show.

=== Revived series ===
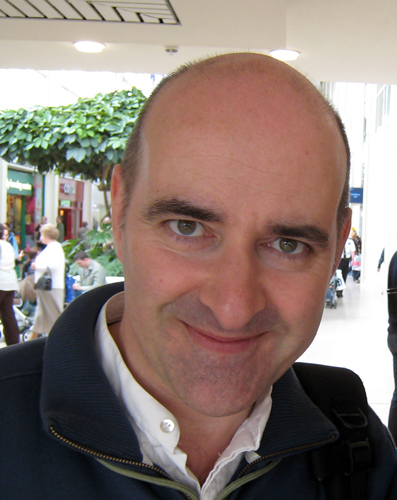
Nicholas Briggs (pictured) voices the Nestene Consciousness in the show's revival

While planning to relaunch the series, showrunner Russell T Davies wished to conserve the Daleks as antagonists for later in the season. Thinking about plans for openers he had created in the 90s, Davies remembered an idea in which a cleaning lady was working in a building where plastic computer terminals came to life and swallowed people. This inspired Davies to use the Nestene Consciousness as the main antagonist. Davies realised Autons would be an effective antagonist for the first episode, as they would leave Rose Tyler, the Doctor's new companion, confused as to what the Autons were; as the Autons were human-shaped mannequins, they would not immediately be assumed as being aliens, which was important in the episode's narrative. Jane Tranter, an executive at the BBC, believed the usage of the Nestene Consciousness and Autons to purely be "nostalgia", but Davies believed that children would recognise mannequins from their day to day lives, which would allow the Autons to provide a "familiar" element to them. Additionally, the Nestene plot would be secondary to the main focus of establishing the Doctor and Rose's character dynamic in the episode.

Prior to the production of the story, the rights to the Autons had to be obtained, which were now held by Baggs as a result of an agreement made with Robert Holmes's estate. The Autons in this episode were redesigned, losing the wigs and masks with eyes holes from the Classic era. Seventy Auton masks were constructed by Neill Gorton and the design team at Millennium FX, with dancers and actors used to heavy costume and mask work being cast to portray the Autons. A scene from the original Spearhead from Space, in which a shop window was broken apart by the Autons and the Autons attacked passerby, was re-created in the episode. Around 50 Autons appeared in the episode, with many attacking the Cardiff high street. Company The Mill created the Nestene design and made the computer-generated model seen in the episode, while Briggs provided the voice of the Nestene.

The Autons were planned to return in the series twelve episode "Praxeus" (2020), but this appearance was scrapped, with writer Pete McTighe citing budgetary constraints and the fact that too many returning monsters were present in the season.

== Reception and analysis ==
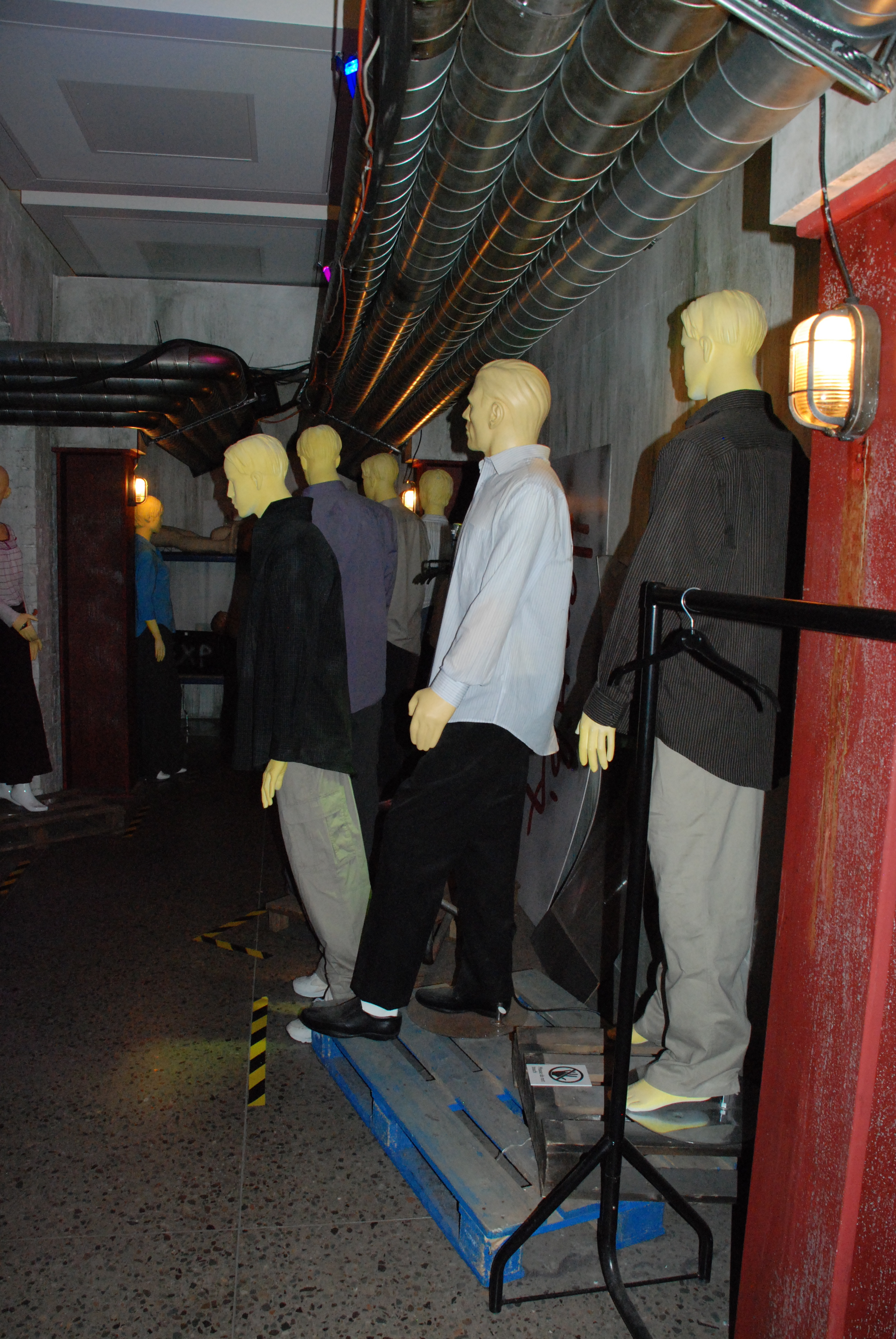
Autons, as shown in the revived series at the Doctor Who Experience.

Since their inception, the Autons have been cited as being among the series' most popular monsters, with the book The Zombie Book: The Encyclopedia of the Living Dead stating that they "proved pretty much impossible to put down completely". Preeti Chhibber, in a piece for Syfy, stated that the Autons were unable to replicate the level of notoriety other antagonists like the Daleks and Cybermen had, but nonetheless were effective antagonists. The book The Doctor's Monsters: Meanings of the Monstrous in Doctor Who cited the Autons' emotionless features, as well as the feeling of uncanny valley that came with their human-like designs, as eliciting a fear that contributes to their appeal as antagonists. The book also cited the Autons as an example of the series' commentary on pollution and consumerism, with the prevalence of plastic and the usage of modern-trending clothing on the attacking Autons being used to enhance this commentary. The Zombie Book: The Encyclopedia of the Living Dead describes the Autons as embodying zombie-like imagery in their method of attack. The book The Science of Doctor Who analysed the feasibility of the Nestene's control over the Autons, stating that while the construction of moveable mannequins was possible, the potential mental control used by the Nestene was not as feasible, and within the realm of then-current science, was not possible.

Though literary critic John Kenneth Muir, in a review of Spearhead from Space, described the Autons as a generic invasion force, he highlighted the scene of the Autons breaking out of shop windows and attacking people on the streets, which he believed to be one of the series' most striking visuals. The scene was described by media historian James Chapman as being a "famous sequence" from the series, with Chapman noting that the serial used elements of "takeover narratives", with the usage of everyday reality being used to make both Spearhead and Terror of the Autons terrifying stories for viewers. The Autons depiction in Terror of the Autons was criticised by critics, who believed the Autons to be too terrifying for younger viewers. Sylvia Clayton, in a piece for The Daily Telegraph, believed that unlike "fantasy" creatures like the Daleks and Cybermen, plastic mannequins were things younger viewers could encounter in day-to-day life, making the Autons substantially more terrifying. Other critics believed a scene in which a policeman turned out to be an Auton in disguise was also too scary. The response to Terror of the Autons and the Autons' role in it resulted in a re-introduction of adventures set in outer-space, which previous serials in the Third Doctor era had avoided.

The Autons' return in "Rose" was cited as an example of "respectful continuity", as it faithfully adapted the monsters while also connecting the then uncertain revival of Doctor Who with an episode (Spearhead from Space) that previously marked a turning point in the history of the show. The book Doctor Who and the Art of Adaptation: Fifty Years of Storytelling identified the Autons' usage as an exception to the usual treatment of returning monsters within the revived series because their appearance in the episode was subdued, with the main focus on the introduction of Rose Tyler. Comparatively, the Nestene's depiction in "Rose" as a large blob-like form, compared to the original squid-like design that had permeated throughout Doctor Who expanded media following the Nestenes' appearances on screen, was met with mixed responses from fans of the series, with many taking different stances on which design was better. According to Once Upon a Time Lord: The Myths and Stories of Doctor Who, this debate emphasised how fans, in the end, determined what was "canon" to a series, as many had decided the squid-like design was the more "correct" design despite the design's usage being primarily in non-televised works.
