= BBV Productions =

UK video, audio, print company founded 1991

BBV Productions is a UK-based video and audio production company founded in 1991, specialising in science fiction drama. The company has expanded to include publishing of novels and scripts associated with its productions.

== Origin ==
Company co-founder Bill Baggs is a longtime fan of the British science fiction television series Doctor Who, and BBV productions often involve characters or actors from that series. It was originally founded as Bill & Ben Video. The "Ben" in the company name is the nickname of Bill Baggs's wife and fellow company co-founder, Helen. Marian Baggs, the mother of Bill Baggs, also operated a second distribution chain on behalf of BBV.

== Video ==
BBV's first production was Summoned by Shadows (1991), co-produced with the BBC Film Club. Partly as a homage to Doctor Who, which Baggs was a fan of, and partly in a pragmatic attempt to take advantage of a pre-existing audience. BBV's next production was The AirZone Solution? in 1993 and involved four of the five surviving actors who had played The Doctor. A new PROBE film was released 15 April 2015 with Hazel Burrows taking over from Caroline John as Liz Shaw.

== Productions ==
=== Video ===
- The Stranger
  - Summoned by Shadows by Christian Darkin
  - More Than A Messiah by Nigel Fairs
  - In Memory Alone by Nicholas Briggs
  - The Terror Game by Nicholas Briggs
  - Breach of the Peace by Nicholas Briggs
  - Eye of the Beholder by Nicholas Briggs
- The Auton trilogy
  - Auton by Nicholas Briggs
  - Auton 2: Sentinel by Nicholas Briggs
  - Auton 3: Awakening by Arthur Wallis (Nicholas Briggs) & Paul Ebbs
- Faction Paradox
  - P.R.O.B.E. Case Files: "Daylight Savings" by James Hornby
  - Overture to Sabbath and the King by Aristide Twain (YouTube release)
- Erimem
  - My mate, Erimem by Iain McLaughlin (YouTube release)
- The Brigadier Adventures
  - P.R.O.B.E. Case Files: "Legend" by James Hornby
- Standalone
  - The Airzone Solution by Nicholas Briggs
  - Cyberon by Lance Parkin
  - Do You Have A Licence To Save This Planet? by Paul Ebbs & Gareth Preston
  - Zygon: When Being You Just Isn't Enough by Jonathan Blum & Lance Parkin
  - Sunrise: Love Again by William Baggs & Kristina Wilde
- Shorts
  - The Auton Diaries
  - The Last 28 by Pip & Jane Baker
- Documentary
  - Stranger Than Fiction
  - Stranger Than Fiction 2: From Script To Screen
  - Stranger than Fiction 3: Acting Up
  - The Doctors: 30 Years of Time Travel and Beyond
  - Bidding Adieu
- Interviews
  - JNT: Uncut!
  - Jon Pertwee: Uncut!
  - Philip Hinchcliffe: Uncut!
  - Nick & Caroline: Uncut!
  - Peter Davison: Uncut!
  - Louise Jameson: Uncut!
  - Sylvester McCoy: Uncut!
- P.R.O.B.E.
  - The Zero Imperative by Mark Gatiss
  - The Devil of Winterborne by Mark Gatiss
  - Unnatural Selection by Mark Gatiss
  - Ghosts of Winterborne by Mark Gatiss
  - When to Die by Bill Baggs
  - P.R.O.B.E. Case Files
    - Volume 1
      - "First Entry" by James Hornby
      - "Kelpie" by James Hornby
      - "Peckham Poltergeist" by James Hornby
      - "Manchester" by James Hornby
      - "Shadow People" by James Hornby
      - "Stacey Facade" by James Hornby
      - "Varunastra" by James Hornby
      - "Doctor X" by James Hornby
      - "Goo!" by Bill Baggs
      - "Sherwood Sorceress" by James Hornby
    - Volume 2
      - "A Message From Sir Andrew"
      - "Daylight Savings" by James Hornby (Crossover with Faction Paradox)
      - "Ichor" by Bill Baggs
      - "Out of the Shadows of Doubt" by James Hornby, Hunter O'Connell, James Wylder & Lucy Wood-Ives, from an initial concept by Aristide Twain
      - "Fog" By Bill Baggs
      - "Lauren Anderson" by James Hornby & Bill Baggs
      - "Living Fiction" by Warren Lewis
      - "The Only Cure" by James Hornby
      - "Ex-President" by James Hornby
      - "Legend" by James Hornby
    - Volume 3
      - "Maxie Masters" by Bill Baggs
      - "O'Kane" by Bill Baggs
      - "Mist Mystery" by Bill Baggs
      - "Stranger" by Bill Baggs
      - "Erlik" by Bill Baggs
      - "St. Swithun" by Bill Baggs
      - "Bridge" by Bill Baggs & Warren Lewis
      - "For The Hell Of It!" by Bill Baggs
    - Volume 4
      - "Portents of Doom" by Chris McAuley & Bill Baggs
      - "Deadwood" by Elliott B. Parmelee & Bill Baggs
      - "Mia" by Leopold Agnew

=== Audio ===
==== Licensed Doctor Who spin-offs ====
- K-9 and his Mistress
  - The Choice by Nigel Fairs
  - The Search by Mark Duncan
- Zygons
  - Homeland by Paul Dearing
  - Absolution by Paul Ebbs
  - The Barnacled Baby by Anthony Keetch
- Krynoids
  - The Root of All Evil by Lance Parkin
  - The Green Man by Zoltán Déry
- Sontarans
  - Silent Warrior by Peter Grehan
  - Old Soldiers by Simon J Gerard and Colin Hill
  - Conduct Unbecoming by Gareth Preston
- Rutans
  - In 2 Minds by Iain Hepburn
- The "I"
  - I Scream by Lance Parkin
- Guy de Carnac
  - The Quality of Mercy by Dave McIntee
- The Rani
  - The Rani Reaps The Whirlwind by Pip & Jane Baker
- The Wirrn
  - Race Memory by Paul Ebbs
- Mike Yates
  - The Killing Stone by Richard Franklin
- Faction Paradox
  - The Eleven Day Empire by Lawrence Miles
  - The Shadow Play by Lawrence Miles
  - Sabbath Dei by Lawrence Miles
  - The Year of the Cat by Lawrence Miles
  - Movers by Lawrence Miles
  - A Labyrinth of Histories by Lawrence Miles
  - Eternal Escape by James Hornby
  - Dionus's War
    - Call Me Ishmael by J.T. Mulholland
    - The Healer's Sin by J.T. Mulholland
    - Me & My Ghost by Bill Baggs
  - Sabbath and the King by Aristide Twain
  - The Confession of Brother Signet by Michael Gilroy-Sinclair
  - Hellscape
    - Lucifer by Trevor Spencer
    - Lucifer's Sleep by Trevor Spencer
    - Babylon's Own Personal Hell by Trevor Spencer
    - Brother's Keeper by Trevor Spencer
    - Unwanted Guest by Trevor Spencer
    - Lilith Fades by Trevor Spencer
- Hellscape
  - The Lilium Saga - Acts I-III by Trevor Spencer
  - The Lilium Saga - Acts IV-VI by Trevor Spencer
- P.R.O.B.E.
  - The Door We Forgot by James Hornby and James Wylder
  - 9 to 5 by James Hornby
  - A Worthy Successor by James Hornby and James Wylder
  - She Came From Another World! by James Wylder
  - What Happened in Manchester by James Hornby
  - Broken Bonds by James Hornby
  - Silver-Tongued Liars by James Wylder
  - New Companions
    - Maxie by Bill Baggs
    - Sam Myers by Trevor Spencer
  - Giles: The Beginning by Bill Baggs
  - First Case by Bill Baggs
  - Bold by Bill Baggs
  - Guardian At The Gate by Chris McAuley
  - The Liz Shaw Files: Honeymoon by Trevor Spencer
- The Brigadier Adventures
  - Memories of Tomorrow by John Peel
  - New Pastures by James Hornby
  - The Fall of Shield Sentai by Charles EP Murphy
  - The Man Inside by Bill Baggs
  - Necessary Force by Steve Lyons
  - Translation by John Peel
- Erimem
  - The Beast of Stalingrad by Iain McLaughlin
  - Prime Imperative by Iain McLaughlin
  - Churchill's Castle by Iain McLaughlin
- The Makers
  - Maker's Wish: After Dark
    - Slalvok by Trevor Spencer & Bill Baggs
  - Maker's Wish
    - Ticket To Ride by Trevor Spencer

==== Unofficial/Apocryphal Doctor Who spin-offs ====
- The Dominie and Alice ("The Professor" and "Ace" until Guests for the Night)
  - Republica by Mark Gatiss
  - Island of Lost Souls by Mark Gatiss
  - Prosperity Island by Tim Saward
  - The Left Hand of Darkness by Mark Duncan
  - The Other Side by Mark Duncan
  - Guests for the Night by Nigel Fairs
  - Ghosts by Nigel Fairs
  - Only Human by Mark J. Thompson
  - Blood Sports by Nigel Fairs
  - Punchline by Jeremy Leadbetter (Robert Shearman)
- Fred
  - Cyber-Hunt by Martin Peterson
  - Vital Signs by Tim Saward
- Cyberons
  - Cyber-Hunt by Martin Peterson
  - Cybergeddon by Paul Ebbs
  - Cyberon by James Hornby (unabridged audiobook of the novelisation of the film)
  - Silver-Tongued Liars by James Wylder
  - Curse of the Cyberons by Chris McAuley
  - The Weapon and the Warrior by John Peel
  - Cyber-Hunt by Callum Phillpott (unabridged audiobook of the novelisation of the audio drama)
- The Stranger
  - The Last Mission by Nicholas Briggs
  - Eye of the Storm by Arthur Wallis (Nicholas Briggs)

==== Stand-Alone ====
- Infidel's Comet by Colin Hill & Simon J Gerard
- The Pattern by Mark Duncan
- The Boy Who Kicked Pigs by Tom Baker
- The Airzone Solution: Novelisation - Enhanced Audio by Charles EP Murphy
- BES Begins by James Mulholland
- The Time Detectives: The Vault by Bill Baggs
- StokerVerse
  - A Whisper in the Darkness by Chris McAuley & Dacre Stoker
  - The Forbidden Act by Chris McAuley
  - Dracula: Origins by Chris McAuley
  - The Sorceress of the Nile by Chris McAuley
  - Terror Under the Rue Morgue by Chris McAuley
- Claudia Christian's Dark Legacies:
  - First Contact by Chris McAuley
  - Heart of Steel by Chris McAuley
- Chaos Theory: Oblation by Grant Foxon
- The Frontiersman's End by Chris McAuley

=== Books ===
==== Novelisations ====
- Cyberon by James Hornby (distributed by Arcbeatle Press)
- Republica by Micah K. Spurling
- Cyber-Hunt by Callum Phillpott
- Cybergeddon by Lupan Evezan
- The Rani Reaps the Whirlwind by Micah K. Spurling
- The Airzone Solution by Charles EP Murphy
- Auton by David Black
- The Root of All Evil by Paul Mount
- The Choice by James Mulholland
- The Stranger: In a Strange Land by Jason Russell
- Cyberon: Origins by Chris McAuley

==== Scripts ====
- Faction Paradox
  - Faction Paradox Protocols: The Scripts Vol. 1 by Lawrence Miles
  - Faction Paradox Protocols: The Scripts Vol. 2 by Lawrence Miles
  - Faction Paradox Protocols: The Scripts Vol. 3 by Lawrence Miles
- Erimem
  - Erimem: The Beast of Stalingrad - The Script by Iain McLaughlin

==== Comics ====
- Cyberon
  - Before The Storm by Leopold Agnew
- Musketeers vs. Cthulhu! by Chris McAuley & Claudia Christian

==== Quiz books ====
- The Ultimate DC Quiz Book by Chris McAuley
- The Ultimate Marvel Quiz Book by Chris McAuley
- The Ultimate Alien Quiz Book by Chris McAuley
- The Ultimate Doctor Who Quiz Book by Chris McAuley
- The Ultimate Terminator Quiz Book by Chris McAuley
- The Ultimate Battlestar Galactica Quiz Book by Chris McAuley, Peter S. Giakoumis and Chris Moore.

== See also ==
- Big Finish Productions
- Reeltime Pictures
