= The Airzone Solution =

1993 British film by Bill Baggs

- DVD cover
- Directed by: Bill Baggs
- Written by: Nicholas Briggs
- Starring: Colin Baker; Nicola Bryant; Peter Davison; Sylvester McCoy; Jon Pertwee; Heather Tracy
- Cinematography: Dick Kursa
- Edited by: Michael Duxbury
- Music by: Alistair Lock
- Production company: BBV
- Distributed by: Carlton International; S & J Films
- Release date: 1993
- Running time: 65 minutes
- Country: United Kingdom
- Language: English

The Airzone Solution (stylised as The AirZone Solution?) is a 1993 British sci-fi-thriller film, produced by BBV. It was written by Nicholas Briggs and directed by Bill Baggs. It stars Colin Baker, Nicola Bryant, Peter Davison, Sylvester McCoy, Jon Pertwee and Heather Tracy.

== Overview ==
The film was a departure from BBV's previous productions of The Stranger, a series of independently made Doctor Who-style productions, complete with cast members from Doctor Who playing similar characters. For The Airzone Solution, BBV gathered four of the five surviving actors who had played the Doctor — Colin Baker, Jon Pertwee, Peter Davison, and Sylvester McCoy (Tom Baker, as in multi-Doctor specials, refused) — as the leads in a modern-day environmental thriller about pollution. Also appearing in a supporting role is Alan Cumming (who would later go on to play King James I in the 2018 episode "The Witchfinders" and voiced Mr. Ring-a-Ding/Lux Imperator in the 2025 episode "Lux"), along with Doctor Who alumni Nicola Bryant and Michael Wisher.

The film was shot on videotape on a very low budget, as was the case with the previous Stranger videos. It has been suggested by some fans that this video was designed to appeal to those who had been disappointed that the mooted Dark Dimension direct-to-VHS special had been cancelled earlier that year.

The writer of the film, Nicholas Briggs, who also plays a small role, went on to work on the revived Doctor Who series in 2005, providing voice-overs for both the Daleks and Cybermen.

== Plot ==
In a future Britain, circa 2091, pollution has reached a point where the populace must often wear filtration masks when they venture outside. AirZone, a powerful corporation, signs a lucrative deal with the government to deal with the problem. The public is told that AirZone plans to build giant filtration plants to clean the atmosphere, but environmentalists are skeptical, especially when people begin dying and disappearing around AirZone facilities.

Investigative filmmaker Al Dunbar (Davison) has been working with Anthony Stanwick (McCoy), the head of one radical environmental group, on a Michael Moore-style exposé documentary on AirZone. But when Dunbar's mentor, the mysterious Oliver Threthewey (Pertwee), says the documentary is useless without more direct proof of AirZone's intentions, Dunbar and Stanwick hatch a plan to infiltrate AirZone's headquarters and hack into their computer mainframe. Stanwick has been aided in this by Rachel (Heather Tracy), an AirZone employee who is acting as his "mole" within the organisation.

Meanwhile, Arnie Davies (Baker), a popular local television meteorologist, is getting ready to go on the air, although he still has time to flirt with the make-up lady and with his girlfriend, journalist Ellie Brown (Nicola Bryant).

Dunbar successfully infiltrates AirZone's offices, but sets off an alarm soon after hacking into the computer. Fleeing from the guards, Dunbar finds himself in a lab where Rachel — now a prisoner of AirZone — is being injected with a green fluid. He helps her to escape, but is killed in the process.

At the moment Dunbar dies, both Arnie and Stanwick experience a vision of his death; for Arnie, this occurs in the middle of a broadcast and he faints on the air. Later, after a recuperating evening with Ellie, Arnie feels better and gets ready to go to work — only to be shocked at seeing an apparition of Dunbar standing in his hallway. Dunbar urges Arnie to investigate AirZone.

Arnie continues to experience visions of Dunbar at work, and is unnerved when he learns that Dunbar had died the night before. After further disturbing displays both during his weather broadcast and again at home, Ellie suggests they investigate Dunbar's home. Ellie is not sure what to make of it when Arnie, relaying instructions from Dunbar, can guide her to a hiding place where Dunbar kept his spare key. Inside, Ellie and Arnie view Dunbar's incomplete documentary but must leave when a detective, carrying a warrant to seize any AirZone property, arrives.

Soon, Arnie finds himself meeting Stanwick and is reassured that his visions of Dunbar are not the result of insanity, as Stanwick also sees the apparition (as does, apparently, Trethewey). Together, Stanwick and Arnie locate Rachel, who is experiencing extreme physical distress as the result of whatever chemical or drug was being pumped into her body at AirZone. Before they can get her to the hospital, she is abducted by a group of masked men. For Arnie, this sparks an obsession with finding the truth about AirZone, and during his next weather report, he digresses to reveal to viewers that AirZone's pollution-filtering plants are increasing the pollution in the atmosphere.

Meanwhile, Ellie is given the biggest assignments of her career: first interviewing the Environment Secretary (played by Michael Wisher) and then covering the public unveiling of AirZone's pollution reduction plan by the head of the company, Robin Archer (Bernadette Gepheart). But she is frustrated when Arnie interrupts the former to give Stanwick face-time with the minister, an act that riles MacNamara (Cummings), a mysterious figure who works on behalf of Archer.

At the press conference, attended by industry representatives from across Britain, Archer unveils AirZone's optimistic plan to reduce pollution, but her sermon is cut short by Arnie (who has been sneaked in by the now-convinced Ellie) brandishing a gun, who demands Archer reveal the truth about why people living near the plants have been dying and disappearing. She refuses, but Stanwick arrives with Rachel in hand (having recovered her with the unexpected help of MacNamara). Rachel and many other Britons have been subjected to genetic experiments, forcing them to grow gill-like appendages to their necks. The AirZone Solution is not to reduce pollution, but to instead increase it and create a new race of humans able to breathe the polluted air. With AirZone's scheme revealed to the public, it collapses. MacNamara actually works for MI5 and apparently has been working against Archer from inside AirZone (and appears to have been behind Rachel's earlier abduction), and leaves saying that AirZone was a good idea but a bad image. Out of nowhere, Threthewey appears and says that Al Dunbar would have been proud of the work done by Arnie, Ellie, and Stanwick. The origin of the Dunbar apparition and why it appeared to Arnie and Stanwick is left unexplained.

== Cast ==
Nicola Bryant and Colin Baker in a scene from the film

- Colin Baker — Arnie Davies
- Peter Davison — Al Dunbar
- Jon Pertwee — Oliver Threthewey
- Sylvester McCoy — Anthony Stanwick
- Nicola Bryant — Elenya "Ellie" Brown
- Alan Cumming — MacNamara
- Heather Tracy — Rachel
- Michael Wisher — Richard Allenby
- Bernadette Gepheart — Robin Archer
- Nicholas Briggs — Sam Flint
- Emma Hill — Polly
- Quentin Rayner — Quentin
- Gary Russell — Detective

== Rating ==
The film was given a PG rating by the BBFC in the UK, and is notable for its use of adult language, as well as the first filmed love scene — albeit brief — between an actor who had played the Doctor and an actress who had played one of the Doctor's companions. Writer Nicholas Briggs did not write the scene, and it was included in the film against his wishes.

== Release ==
The film was released direct-to-video by BBV.

== Reception ==
Dylan Rees wrote in the book Downtime - The Lost Years of Doctor Who that the film was a "solid drama in its own right", despite the film not having any connections to Doctor Who.
