= The Stranger (film series) =

The Stranger video series
- Directed by: Bill Baggs
- Written by: Christian Darkin (1); Nigel Fairs (2); Nicholas Briggs (3–6)
- Produced by: Bill Baggs
- Starring: Colin Baker; Nicola Bryant; Louise Jameson; David Troughton; John Wadmore
- Cinematography: Dick Kursa; Andy Bell (6)
- Edited by: Michael Duxbury (4)
- Music by: Duncan Chave (1); Alistair Lock (2); Harvey Summers (3); Nicholas Briggs (4); Stephen Root (6)
- Production companies: BBV; S & J Video (3)
- Running time: 34 minutes (1); 43 minutes (2); 40 minutes (3); 50 minutes (4); 47 minutes (5); 85 minutes (6)
- Country: United Kingdom
- Language: English

The Stranger is a series of direct-to-video (and audio CD) science-fiction dramas produced by BBV and starring Colin Baker. They are now available on DVD.

The series began in 1991 with Summoned by Shadows, co-produced with the BBC Film Club as a knowing homage to the long-running British science fiction television series Doctor Who (of which BBV founder Bill Baggs was a fan) and in a pragmatic attempt to take advantage of the consequent pre-existing audience. Summoned by Shadows is a Who-style tale of strange doings in an unspecified time period on Earth featuring three actors known for their roles in Doctor Who and playing similar characters. The unnamed protagonist (listed in the credits as "The Stranger") is played by Colin Baker, his assistant Miss Brown by Nicola Bryant, who had played the Doctor's assistant Peri Brown opposite Colin Baker for two years, and the villain of the piece by Michael Wisher, who had been the first actor to play Davros.

The second story, More than a Messiah, adapted the Doctor Who Audio Visuals story of the same name, but with the Stranger and Miss Brown substituted for the Doctor and companion Ria (who was modelled after Peri). In a further connection, it co-starred Sophie Aldred, better known as Ace from Doctor Who, and Peter Miles, who had co-starred (opposite Wisher) in the TV serial Genesis of the Daleks – both in completely different roles.

In Memory Alone, the third film, found the Stranger and Miss Brown stranded without their mysterious transport (never seen) in a desolate train station with amnesia, and battling a robot and a mysterious man played by Nicholas Briggs (who also wrote the film along with others in the Stranger series). Most releases of this film (including VHS) include a behind-the-scenes featurette and a blooper reel.

While the first three may be (and often were) taken as Doctor Who by another name, the departure of the Miss Brown character (for which Nicola Bryant does not speak with Peri Brown's American accent) and the Stranger himself being likewise "returned to his proper time and place" at the story's conclusion allowed for a move to clarify The Stranger's status as separate work of fiction and developed an identity of its own.

The adventures of the Stranger ran in all to six videos (and four audio dramas, although the second audio drama was much the same as the sixth video).

== History of the Stranger ==
In a pan-dimensional area referred to as the "Dimensional Web", there exist two races: the Protectorate, which are currently dominant and in charge, and the Preceptors, apparently defeated by the Protectorate. The Preceptors act by taking on corporeal forms within the material universe and carry out random acts of violence, terrorism and assassination in an effort to strike back at their oppressors (although it is never truly determined which race is in the right and which is in the wrong), usually in teams of two or three. One such Preceptor cell is headed by Solomon, considered one of the top Preceptor leaders. His second-in-command and partner is Egan (played by David Troughton) and the third member of the team is a relative newcomer named Saul (John Wadmore). Solomon and Egan have worked together for a long time and therefore have complete faith in one another.

However, one mission, while accomplishing the objective (the assassination of an unimportant female caterer), ends in disaster with Solomon being captured by the Protectorate and Egan and Saul managing to escape. Since the Protectorate no longer believe in execution (their own past is too bloody for that) and incarceration would be a drain on their resources, Solomon is selected to be the first to undergo a new process – the Estrangement Programme, in which the prejudices of the subject are "extracted" by a form of mental block or conditioning and wiping out all past memories of the subject's "crimes" (the Protectorate state emphatically that this is not brainwashing).

Note: In the audio adventure "The Last Mission", it is revealed that during the above mission Solomon was captured by the planet's local security force, but the officer in charge (Elisabeth Sladen) turned out to be a Protectorate agent who had set a trap for all three Preceptors. While Solomon was in her custody, she offered Solomon a deal in which, in return for her allowing the Preceptors to accomplish their mission and Egan and Saul's escape, Solomon would surrender himself to the Protectorate and undergo the then-experimental Estrangement Programme. Believing that his beliefs were not prejudices and that the program would not affect him, he agreed, never revealing the bargain to Egan and Saul.

After Solomon undergoes the procedure, he is assigned a Protectorate observer who also acts as a companion, Miss Brown (Nicola Bryant), and begins his new life as the Doctor-like "Stranger". However, in the adventure In Memory Alone, the Stranger, while suffering from amnesia and to defeat a malfunctioning combat suit, is forced to hook up his own brain to a computer system, and the resulting shock causes the mental conditioning to be disrupted. The Stranger arrives in England on Earth in The Terror Game still suffering from amnesia, but runs into Egan and Saul (who now believe that the Stranger, now identified as "Solomon", may have turned traitor) and Tamora Hennessay (Louise Jameson).

After Tamora reveals herself to be another Protectorate agent, Solomon escapes and goes into hiding under the name of "Preston Richards" while slowly recovering his lost memories and trying to learn whether or not he is still being affected by the Estrangement Programme. In the adventure Breach of the Peace, Egan and Saul, using the identities of Metropolitan Police detectives, track Solomon down and force him to take them back into the Web, but Metaphysic, a heavily guarded research project where an experiment in psychokinesis is being conducted by a Dr Hunter (Geoffrey Beevers) on a talented girl named Meta (Bernadette Gepheart), causes a tear in the Web that drags Solomon, Egan and Saul back to England (Eye of the Beholder) and forces them to intervene when Hunter's experiment goes out of control.

== Video series ==
Year	Title	Writer	Starring Doctor Who actors:
January 1991	Summoned by Shadows	Christian Darkin	Colin Baker, Nicola Bryant and Michael Wisher
January 1992	More than a Messiah	Nigel Fairs	Colin Baker, Nicola Bryant, Peter Miles and Sophie Aldred
January 1993	In Memory Alone	Nicholas Briggs	Colin Baker, Nicola Bryant and Nicholas Briggs
January 1994	The Terror Game	Nicholas Briggs	Colin Baker, Louise Jameson, David Troughton and Nicholas Briggs
December 1994	Breach of the Peace	Nicholas Briggs	Colin Baker, Caroline John, David Troughton and Nicholas Briggs
July 1995	Eye of the Beholder	Nicholas Briggs	Colin Baker, David Troughton, Geoffrey Beevers and Nicholas Briggs

Another BBV production, The Airzone Solution, is sometimes erroneously listed as part of the Stranger series. In fact, it is a standalone "ecological thriller" film that, other than its cast, has no connection to either the Stranger or Doctor Who.

=== Reception ===
In 1993, Your Sinclair magazine described the first three films as "well worth investigating", adding: "What's really interesting is that they show that Colin Baker didn't have to be as crap as he was in [Doctor Who]. They're pretty odd and cheaply made, but fun and quite stylish (and, at less than an hour, short).

In 2017, Starburst magazine called Summoned by Shadows "almost wilfully baroque" and arguably "the nadir (or zenith – your mileage will almost certainly vary, depending upon when and in what circumstance you first saw it)" of the "wild abandon" of Doctor Who's off-air years in the 1990s.

== Audio series ==
Title	Writer	Starring Doctor Who actors:	Notes
The Last Mission	Nicholas Briggs	Colin Baker, Elisabeth Sladen and David Troughton	
Eye of the Storm	Nicholas Briggs	Colin Baker and David Troughton	
Coming of Shadows	Stuart Robinson and James Potter		Bonus audio drama on the DVD release of Summoned by Shadows
Force of Nature	Stuart Robinson and James Potter		Bonus audio drama on the DVD release of More than a Messiah

Eye of the Storm is the basis for the video Eye of the Beholder, and while having the same basic plotline trims down the number of parts/actors, changes certain events and has a different ending with Meta deliberately sacrificing herself to save Solomon, Egan and Saul (whereas in the video Solomon is forced to kill Meta at her own request to save himself and Egan).
