= The Mind of Evil =

056 – The Mind of Evil
- Doctor Who serial

Cast
- Doctor: Jon Pertwee – Third Doctor
- Companion: Katy Manning – Jo Grant
- Others: Nicholas Courtney – Brigadier Lethbridge-Stewart; Richard Franklin – Captain Mike Yates; John Levene – Sergeant Benton; Roger Delgado – The Master; Fernanda Marlowe – Corporal Bell; Patrick Godfrey – Major Cosworth; Simon Lack – Kettering; Pik-Sen Lim – Chin Lee; Kristopher Kum – Fu Peng; Tommy Duggan – Senator Alcott; Raymond Westwell – Prison Governor; Michael Sheard – Dr. Roland Summers; Roy Purcell – Chief Prison Officer Powers; Eric Mason – Senior Prison Officer Green; Dave Carter, Bill Matthews, Barry Wade, Martin Gordon, Tony Jenkins – Prison Officers; Clive Scott – Arthur Linwood; Neil McCarthy – George Patrick Barnham; William Marlowe – Mailer; Haydn Jones – Vosper; David Calderisi – Charlie; Johnny Barrs – Fuller; Matthew Walters – Main Gates Prisoner

Production
- Directed by: Timothy Combe
- Written by: Don Houghton
- Script editor: Terrance Dicks
- Produced by: Barry Letts
- Executive producer: None
- Music by: Dudley Simpson
- Production code: FFF
- Series: Season 8
- Running time: 6 episodes, 25 minutes each
- First broadcast: 30 January 1971
- Last broadcast: 6 March 1971

Chronology
← Preceded by Terror of the Autons	Followed by → The Claws of Axos

The Mind of Evil is the second serial of the eighth season of the British science fiction television series Doctor Who, which was first broadcast in six weekly parts on BBC1 from 30 January to 6 March 1971.

In the serial, the alien time traveller the Master (Roger Delgado) is plotting to start World War III by destroying a peace conference between the United States and China in London by using a nerve gas missile he hijacked from the organisation UNIT.

All six episodes of the serial had existed only as black and white telerecordings after the original colour video tapes were wiped. For the serial's DVD release in 2013, a mixture of hand-colourised key-frames in conjunction with manual and automated colour interpolation for episode one, and the decoding of chroma dot signals recorded in the monochrome film for episodes two to six was employed to recolourise it.

== Plot ==
The Third Doctor and Jo visit Stangmoor Prison to examine a new method of treating criminals, whereby negative impulses are removed from the mind using the Keller Machine. Professor Kettering, who is managing the use of the process at the behest of the absent Emile Keller, reconditions a number of inmates including Barnham, a hardened criminal who reverts to an innocent and childlike state due to the process. The Doctor's suspicions about the Keller Machine are heightened following a string of deaths, including that of Kettering himself, which occur when the machine is operated. Each death seems to involve personal phobias, and the Doctor is threatened by an inferno when he gets too close to the machine.

Meanwhile, Brigadier Lethbridge-Stewart and the troops of UNIT are handling the security arrangements for the first World Peace Conference. Captain Chin Lee of the Chinese delegation is behaving strangely and attempting to heighten tension in relations with the United States. It emerges that her actions are under the influence of the Master. She uses the transmitted power of the Keller Machine against the American delegate, Senator Alcott, who barely survives the attack. Captain Chin is deconditioned by the Doctor and tells him that Emile Keller is the Master, whom the Doctor has previously trapped on Earth by stealing the dematerialisation circuit of his TARDIS.

At Stangmoor a riot has broken out and resulted in a dangerous criminal, Harry Mailer, seizing control of the prison. Jo is briefly taken hostage, but she enables the guards to retake the prison. The Master, who has heard of the riot by eavesdropping on UNIT's radio communications, arrives and meets Mailer, to whom he supplies enough gas grenades for Mailer and his prisoners to retake control of the prison. The Doctor returns to the prison only to be captured by the Master, who sets the Keller Machine loose on the mind of his old foe, weakening the Doctor considerably. However the Master is losing control of the Keller Machine, which contains an alien mind parasite that is dangerous even to a Time Lord, and forces the Doctor to help him contain its power. This done, the Doctor is returned to his cell.

The Master has come to Stangmoor to recruit the prisoners as a private army, and uses them to hijack a UNIT convoy transporting a deadly Thunderbolt nerve gas missile, which he intends to fire at the Peace Conference. Captain Mike Yates, who was in charge of the convoy, is taken prisoner by the criminals. Left in the dark, the Brigadier decides the Thunderbolt missile must be at Stangmoor and comes to the rescue in a "Trojan Horse" style assault. UNIT troops take control of the prison, killing Mailer and the other leading rioters. But the Keller Machine is growing stronger, and now breaks free of the temporary restraints placed on it by the Doctor, who discovers by chance that Barnham, having previously been subjected to the Keller process and thus having no evil left in his mind, has become immune to the mind parasite.

Yates contacts UNIT and informs them that the Thunderbolt is hidden on an abandoned airfield near the prison. The Doctor contacts the Master, offering to return his dematerialisation circuit in exchange for the missile. The Master agrees on condition he will come alone. But the Doctor uses Barnham to transport the Keller Machine to the airfield and turn the mind parasite loose on the Master. With the Master helpless, the Doctor is able to trigger the missile's self-destruct circuit and the Thunderbolt and the Keller Machine are destroyed. The Master uses the chaos to escape with his dematerialisation circuit, killing Barnham in the process. He contacts the Doctor by telephone to taunt him that he is now free while the Doctor remains trapped in his exile on Earth.

=== Continuity ===
The mind parasite attacks the Doctor on three separate occasions. The first visions are tongues of flame, enveloping the Doctor's terror-stricken face. He tells Jo as he recovers, "Not long ago I saw an entire world consumed by fire..." This is a reference to the recent serial Inferno, also written by Don Houghton.

== Production ==
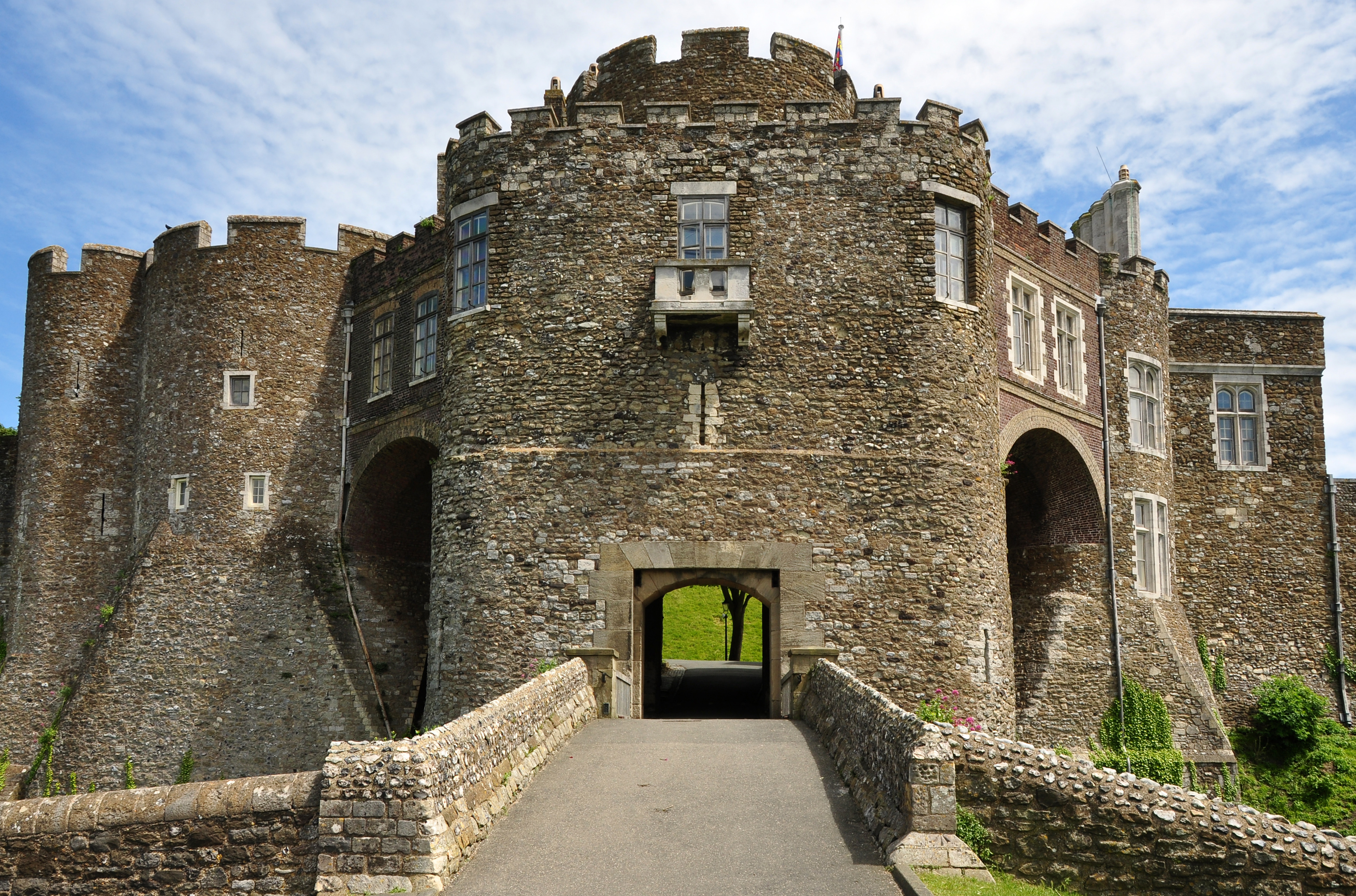
Location filming for the exterior prison scenes took place at Dover Castle

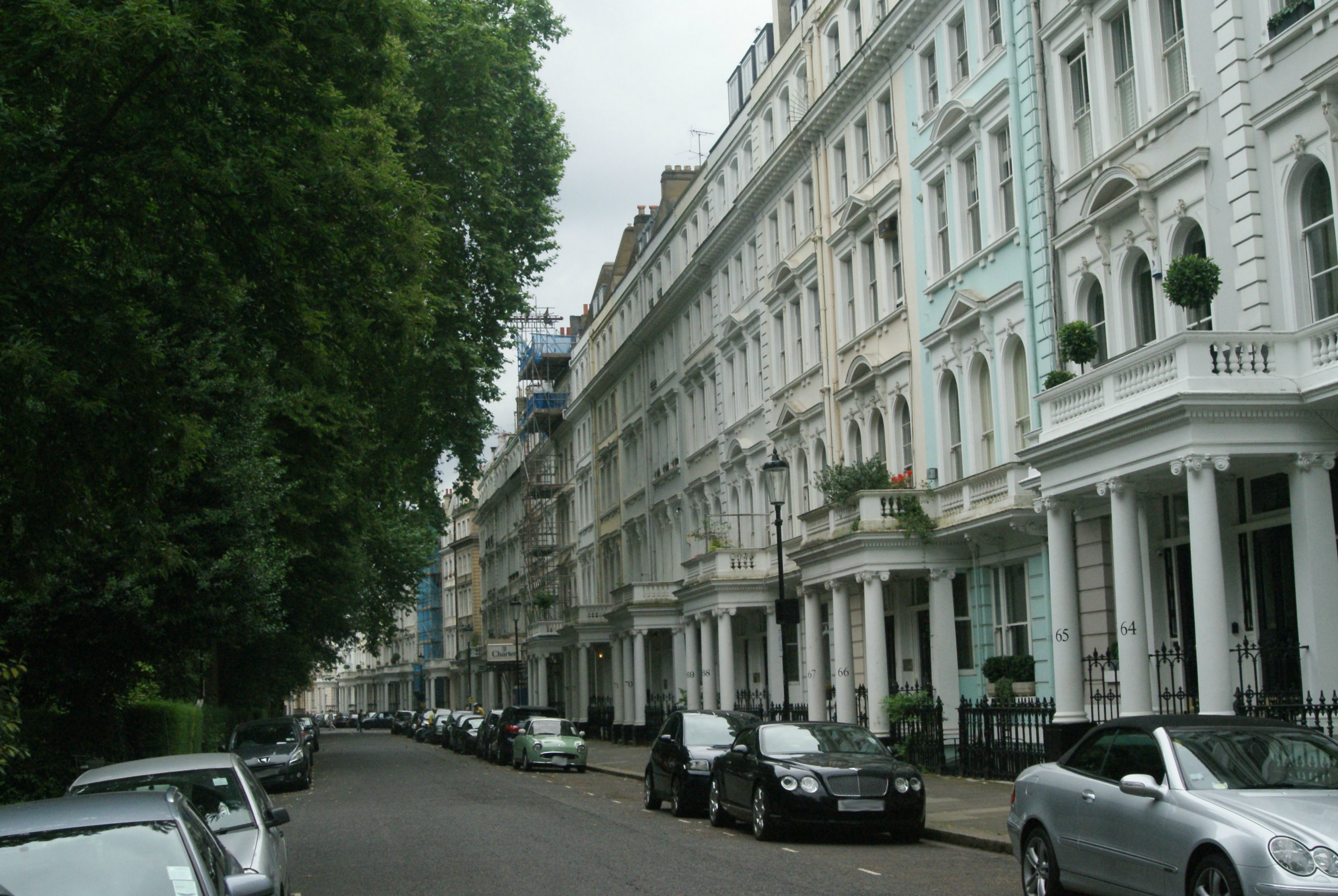
Cornwall Gardens in London served as the location for the peace conference exterior scenes

Working titles for this story included The Pandora Machine, Man Hours and The Pandora Box.

The production filmed in Kent where some exteriors, primarily for Stangmoor Prison, were filmed in and around Dover Castle. The Thunderbolt missile is portrayed by a real (but non-operational) Bloodhound missile on loan from the RAF. The exterior scenes for the World Peace Conference were filmed on location in Cornwall Gardens in Kensington, London. The junction of Archer's Court Road with Pineham Road in Whitfield was the location where the Master's troops ambush the missile convoy. The hangar at the former RAF Swingate was used as the Master's hiding place for his deadly missile and Manston Airport was the base for the helicopter company providing the choppers and aerial footage in the series. This serial went so excessively over budget – primarily due to the use of the helicopter in episode 6 – that its director, Timothy Combe, was banned by Barry Letts from being considered for any subsequent Who work.

=== Cast notes ===
The serial features a guest appearance by Michael Sheard, who had previously appeared with William Hartnell in The Ark, and would later appear with Tom Baker in Pyramids of Mars (as Laurence Scarman) and in The Invisible Enemy (as Lowe), with Peter Davison in Castrovalva (as Mergrave), and with Sylvester McCoy in Remembrance of the Daleks (as the Headmaster at the Coal Hill School). See also Celebrity appearances in Doctor Who.

Katy Manning stated this as her favourite story from her three years on the show as Jo Grant.

== Broadcast and reception ==
Episode	Title	Run time	Original release date	UK viewers (millions)	Archive
1	"Episode One"	24:39	30 January 1971	6.1	Manual colourisation
2	"Episode Two"	24:31	6 February 1971	8.8	Chroma dot colour recovery
3	"Episode Three"	24:30	13 February 1971	7.5	Chroma dot colour recovery
4	"Episode Four"	24:40	20 February 1971	7.4	Chroma dot colour recovery
5	"Episode Five"	23:34	27 February 1971	7.6	Chroma dot colour recovery
6	"Episode Six"	24:48	6 March 1971	7.3	Chroma dot colour recovery

David J. Howe and Stephen James Walker, in their 1998 book Doctor Who: The Television Companion, noted that the Master's plan was "so convoluted that it seriously lacks credibility". However, they wrote that the story was an "undoubted success" because "the action is brought to the screen with such style and panache that the viewer hardly notices" the plot problems, with the direction and the alien menace being the highlights. In 2009, Mark Braxton of Radio Times gave The Mind of Evil four stars out of five, also praising the direction and Delgado's Master, though he noted there was a high body count. SFX reviewer Ian Berriman gave the serial three out of five stars, finding it enjoyable if one did not concentrate on the Master's plan, noting that the "two aspects of the plan never dovetail satisfactorily". DVD Talk's John Sinnott rated The Mind of Evil three and a half out of five stars, writing that it kept a good pace and had "all of the elements that made Pertwee's run so enjoyable".

== Commercial releases ==
=== In print ===
The Mind of Evil
- Author: Terrance Dicks
- Cover artist: Andrew Skilleter
- Series: Doctor Who book: Target novelisations
- Release number: 96
- Publisher: Target Books
- Publication date: 11 July 1985
- ISBN: 0-426-20166-3

A novelisation of this serial, written by Terrance Dicks, was published by Target Books in March 1985.

=== Home media ===
The original soundtrack for this serial was released on CD in the UK in February 2009. The linking narration was provided by Richard Franklin.

For many years, this story was unique amongst Pertwee serials in that the BBC held no complete colour copies of any of its episodes. Four and a half minutes of colour footage from episode six existed on an off-air domestic NTSC Betamax tape, the rest of the episode on the tape having been overwritten by the recording of a different programme. The serial was released on VHS in May 1998 using the BBC's black-and-white 16mm film recordings. The colour scenes, restored by combining the colour signal from the off-air recording and the black and white signal from the film recording, were included as a bonus extra after the story. Several colour clips from the story were included on the 2011 DVD release Day of the Daleks as part of the UNIT family history.

The serial was released on DVD in June 2013. Episodes two to six were restored to colour via the chroma dot colour recovery technique used for other black-and-white Pertwee-era stories. The telerecording of episode one does not contain chroma dot information as it was filtered out at the time it was made, so was recoloured using colour referenced from the other restored episodes. Keyframes, including the first frame of a shot and every fifth frame thereafter (approximately 7,000 in total) were hand coloured by Stuart Humphryes. Motion-estimation software was then used to interpolate the extrapolated colour from the key frames into the intervening frames.

On 8 March 2021, this story was released on Blu-ray alongside the rest of Season 8 with a brand new restoration.
