= Doctor Who season 8 =

1971 season of British sci-fi TV series

Doctor Who
- Season 8
- Cover art of the Blu-ray release for the complete season
- Starring: Jon Pertwee; Katy Manning; Nicholas Courtney; John Levene; Richard Franklin; Roger Delgado
- No. of stories: 5
- No. of episodes: 25

Release
- Original network: BBC1
- Original release: 2 January – 19 June 1971

Season chronology
- ← Previous; Season 7 Next → Season 9

The eighth season of British science fiction television series Doctor Who began on 2 January 1971 with Terror of the Autons and ended with The Dæmons featuring Jon Pertwee as the Third Doctor. This is the second of five series which Barry Letts produced consecutively and Terrance Dicks was the script editor.

== Casting ==
=== Main cast ===
- Jon Pertwee as the Third Doctor
- Katy Manning as Jo Grant

Jon Pertwee continues his role as the Third Doctor. Katy Manning makes her first appearance as companion Jo Grant in Terror of the Autons.

=== Recurring cast ===
- Nicholas Courtney as Brigadier Lethbridge-Stewart
- John Levene as Sergeant Benton
- Richard Franklin as Mike Yates
- Roger Delgado as The Master

Nicholas Courtney and John Levene continue their roles of Brigadier Lethbridge-Stewart and Sergeant Benton, while Richard Franklin makes his first appearance as Captain Mike Yates.

Roger Delgado makes his first appearance as The Master in Terror of the Autons and continues to make appearances in each of the five serials.

=== Guest stars ===
Michael Wisher returns as a guest playing Rex Farrell in Terror of the Autons. Fernanda Marlowe makes appearances in The Mind of Evil and The Claws of Axos as Corporal Bell. Bernard Kay makes his fourth and final appearance in the show as Caldwell in Colony in Space.

== Serials ==
The season marks the first appearance of the Master who goes on to make further appearances through the season in every serial as the main antagonist who is finally captured at the end of the season. Colony in Space was the first serial set away from Earth since The War Games at the end of Season 6, and came about as a result of producer Barry Letts' feeling that the Earthbound stories of the Doctor's exile were too limiting in terms of potential plotting.

No. story	No. in season	Serial title	Episode titles	Directed by	Written by	Original release date	Prod. code	UK viewers (millions)	AI
55	1	Terror of the Autons	"Episode One"	Barry Letts	Robert Holmes	2 January 1971	EEE	7.3	—
55	1	Terror of the Autons	"Episode Two"	Barry Letts	Robert Holmes	9 January 1971	EEE	8.0	—
55	1	Terror of the Autons	"Episode Three"	Barry Letts	Robert Holmes	16 January 1971	EEE	8.1	—
55	1	Terror of the Autons	"Episode Four"	Barry Letts	Robert Holmes	23 January 1971	EEE	8.4	—
The Master arrives on Earth and makes an alliance with the Autons to conquer the planet.
56	2	The Mind of Evil	"Episode One"	Timothy Combe	Don Houghton	30 January 1971	FFF	6.1	—
56	2	The Mind of Evil	"Episode Two"	Timothy Combe	Don Houghton	6 February 1971	FFF	8.8	—
56	2	The Mind of Evil	"Episode Three"	Timothy Combe	Don Houghton	13 February 1971	FFF	7.5	—
56	2	The Mind of Evil	"Episode Four"	Timothy Combe	Don Houghton	20 February 1971	FFF	7.4	—
56	2	The Mind of Evil	"Episode Five"	Timothy Combe	Don Houghton	27 February 1971	FFF	7.6	—
56	2	The Mind of Evil	"Episode Six"	Timothy Combe	Don Houghton	6 March 1971	FFF	7.3	—
The Master creates the Keller Machine, a device that appears to rehabilitate prisoners, but instead kills them.
57	3	The Claws of Axos	"Episode One"	Michael Ferguson	Bob Baker and Dave Martin	13 March 1971	GGG	7.3	—
57	3	The Claws of Axos	"Episode Two"	Michael Ferguson	Bob Baker and Dave Martin	20 March 1971	GGG	8.0	—
57	3	The Claws of Axos	"Episode Three"	Michael Ferguson	Bob Baker and Dave Martin	27 March 1971	GGG	6.4	—
57	3	The Claws of Axos	"Episode Four"	Michael Ferguson	Bob Baker and Dave Martin	3 April 1971	GGG	7.8	—
The Axons land on Earth supposedly peacefully, even offering a new energy source. However, that is not their real purpose.
58	4	Colony in Space	"Episode One"	Michael E. Briant	Malcolm Hulke	10 April 1971	HHH	7.6	—
58	4	Colony in Space	"Episode Two"	Michael E. Briant	Malcolm Hulke	17 April 1971	HHH	8.5	—
58	4	Colony in Space	"Episode Three"	Michael E. Briant	Malcolm Hulke	24 April 1971	HHH	9.5	—
58	4	Colony in Space	"Episode Four"	Michael E. Briant	Malcolm Hulke	1 May 1971	HHH	8.1	—
58	4	Colony in Space	"Episode Five"	Michael E. Briant	Malcolm Hulke	8 May 1971	HHH	8.8	—
58	4	Colony in Space	"Episode Six"	Michael E. Briant	Malcolm Hulke	15 May 1971	HHH	8.7	—
On the human colony Uxarieus, the colonists' crops are failing and a giant reptile appears to be killing them.
59	5	The Dæmons	"Episode One"	Christopher Barry	Guy Leopold (Robert Sloman and Barry Letts)	22 May 1971	JJJ	9.2	—
59	5	The Dæmons	"Episode Two"	Christopher Barry	Guy Leopold (Robert Sloman and Barry Letts)	29 May 1971	JJJ	8.0	—
59	5	The Dæmons	"Episode Three"	Christopher Barry	Guy Leopold (Robert Sloman and Barry Letts)	5 June 1971	JJJ	8.1	—
59	5	The Dæmons	"Episode Four"	Christopher Barry	Guy Leopold (Robert Sloman and Barry Letts)	12 June 1971	JJJ	8.1	—
59	5	The Dæmons	"Episode Five"	Christopher Barry	Guy Leopold (Robert Sloman and Barry Letts)	19 June 1971	JJJ	8.3	—
The Master awakens the demonic Azal from his spaceship under a Bronze Age burial mound.

== Broadcast ==
The entire season was broadcast from 2 January to 19 June 1971.

== Home media ==
=== VHS releases ===
Season	Story no.	Serial name	Duration	Release date		
Season	Story no.	Serial name	Duration	UK	Australia	USA / Canada
8	55	Terror of the Autons	4 × 25 min.	April 1993	June 1993	June 1995
8	56	The Mind of Evil	6 × 25 min.	May 1998 (B+W Re-mastered) (2 × VHS)	March 1999	January 1999 (2 × VHS)
8	57	The Claws of Axos	4 × 25 min.	May 1992	October 1992	June 1996
8	58	Colony in Space	6 × 25 min.	November 2001 (Note: 2 × VHS released as part of a box set "Colony in Space / The Time Monster")	December 2001	January 2003
8	59	The Pertwee Years; The Daemons (Note: Episode 5)	1 × 25 min.	March 1992	October 1992	October 1992
8	59	The Dæmons	5 × 25 min.	March 1993	July 1993	October 1993

=== DVD and Blu-ray releases ===
All releases are for DVD unless otherwise indicated:

- ^{(B)} indicates a Blu-ray release

Season	Story no.	Serial name	Duration	Release date		
Season	Story no.	Serial name	Duration	R2	R4	R1
8	55	Terror of the Autons (Note: Only available as part of the Mannequin Mania box set in Regions 2 and 4. Only available individually in Region 1.)	4 × 25 min.	9 May 2011	2 June 2011	10 May 2011
8	56	The Mind of Evil	6 × 25 min.	3 June 2013	5 June 2013	11 June 2013
8	57	The Claws of Axos	4 × 25 min.	25 April 2005	7 July 2005	8 November 2005
8	57	The Claws of Axos (Special Edition)	4 × 25 min.	22 October 2012	7 November 2012	13 November 2012
8	58	Colony in Space	6 × 25 min.	3 October 2011	1 December 2011	8 November 2011
8	59	The Dæmons	5 × 25 min.	19 March 2012	19 April 2012	10 April 2012
8	55–59	Complete Season 8 (Note: Released as Doctor Who: The Collection – Season 8 in Region B. Released as Doctor Who – Jon Pertwee: Complete Season Two in Region A.)	25 × 25 min. 1 × 30 min. 1 × 90 min.	8 March 2021 ^{(B)}	26 May 2021 ^{(B)}	1 June 2021 ^{(B)}

== In print ==
Season	Story no.	Library no. (Note: Number in Target's Doctor Who Library, if applicable)	Novelisation title	Author	Hardcover release date (Note: Published by Target's parent companies (Allen Wingate, W. H. Allen, BBC Books) unless otherwise indicated)	Paperback release date (Note: Published by Target Books (or by BBC Books under the Target Collection umbrella) unless otherwise indicated)	Audiobook	
Season	Story no.	Library no.	Novelisation title	Author	Hardcover release date	Paperback release date	Release date (Note: Unabridged from BBC Audio / AudioGo unless otherwise indicated)	Narrator
8	055	63	Doctor Who and the Terror of the Autons	Terrance Dicks	19 February 1981	15 May 1975	5 August 2010	Geoffrey Beevers
8	056	96	The Mind of Evil	Terrance Dicks	21 March 1985	11 July 1985	6 April 2017	Richard Franklin
8	057	10	Doctor Who and the Claws of Axos	Terrance Dicks	21 April 1977		4 June 2016	Richard Franklin
8	058	23	Doctor Who and the Doomsday Weapon	Malcolm Hulke	18 March 1982	18 March 1974	3 September 2007	Geoffrey Beevers
8	059	15	Doctor Who and the Dæmons	Barry Letts	14 January 1982	17 October 1974	14 August 2008	Barry Letts

== Tie-In Comics ==
During the release of the season, several comics were published to tie in to the events of the season. The Kingdom Builders (Set before the events of the season) was published in TV Comic magazine. Gemini Plan, Timebenders (Set after the events of the season) & The Vogan Slaves (Set years into The Doctor's future) were published in Countdown magazine.
