= The Claws of Axos =

057 – The Claws of Axos
- Doctor Who serial

Cast
- Doctor: Jon Pertwee – Third Doctor
- Companion: Katy Manning – Jo Grant
- Others: Nicholas Courtney – Brigadier Lethbridge-Stewart; Richard Franklin – Captain Mike Yates; John Levene – Sergeant Benton; Roger Delgado – The Master; Fernanda Marlowe – Corporal Bell; Peter Bathurst – Chinn; Paul Grist – Bill Filer; Donald Hewlett – George Hardiman; David Savile – Winser; Tim Pigott-Smith – Captain Harker; Kenneth Benda – The Minister; Derek Ware – Pigbin Josh; Michael Walker, David G. March – Radar Operators; Royston Farrell – Technician; Bernard Holley, Patricia Gordino, John Hicks, Debbie Lee London – Axons

Production
- Directed by: Michael Ferguson
- Written by: Bob Baker; Dave Martin
- Script editor: Terrance Dicks
- Produced by: Barry Letts
- Executive producer: None
- Music by: Dudley Simpson
- Production code: GGG
- Series: Season 8
- Running time: 4 episodes, 25 minutes each
- First broadcast: 13 March 1971
- Last broadcast: 3 April 1971

Chronology
| ← Preceded by The Mind of Evil | Followed by → Colony in Space |

The Claws of Axos is the third serial of the eighth season of the British science fiction television series Doctor Who, which was first broadcast in four weekly parts on BBC1 from 13 March to 3 April 1971.

In the serial, set in Britain, the alien organism Axos spreads its Axonite particles across the Earth to allow itself to feed on all life on the planet.

== Plot ==
A group of aliens calling themselves the Axons land on Earth, desperately in need of fuel. They propose to exchange the miracle substance they call Axonite for some much-needed energy. Axonite is introduced as a "thinking" molecule that can replicate any substance. However, it turns out that the ship, and the Axons themselves, are all a single organism called Axos, whose purpose is to feed itself by draining all energy through the Axonite (which is just a part of itself), including the energy of every life form on Earth. The deception about the Axonite's beneficial properties was to facilitate the distribution of Axonite across the globe, and help end world hunger, given the property of Axonite being able to enlarge and multiply any given matter.

Meanwhile, the Master, who was captured by Axos and used his knowledge of Earth as a bargaining chip for his life and freedom, escapes Axos and makes his way to the Third Doctor's TARDIS—his own having been seized by Axos. He plans to repair it to escape from Earth.

Axos itself becomes interested in the Doctor's knowledge of time travel and takes him prisoner aboard itself. It now plans to broaden its feeding base by travelling through time as well as space. The Doctor, realising this, plans to trick Axos into linking up its drive unit to his TARDIS so that he can send Axos into a perpetual time loop. After fooling the Master into completing the repairs on his TARDIS, the Doctor does just that. This results in every part of Axos dematerialising from Earth, including the Axon automatons and the Axonite.

At the end, with the Master having escaped in his own TARDIS during the confusion aboard Axos, the Doctor returns to Earth, but not of his own volition. The Time Lords have programmed the TARDIS to always return to Earth, making the Doctor, as he notes, "some kind of a galactic yo-yo!".

== Production ==
=== Writing ===
In late 1969, script editor Terrance Dicks contacted new writing duo Bob Baker and Dave Martin after reading a draft script they had sent around the BBC for another production, A Man's Life. After offering the duo a seven-part story in November 1969 for Doctor Who's eighth season, Baker and Martin submitted some various storylines they had. Despite the storylines not being suitable for a serial, Dicks commissioned an opening episode from them on 1 December, but as part of a six-parter, rather than a seven-parter.

The original storyline for the serial was set in central London, with Battersea Power Station taking the place of Nuton Power Complex. However, the serial would have been too expensive to make on the budget available, and Dicks promptly told the writing pair to scale down the story. After going back to the storyline stage, they decided to set the story just outside London, and excluded the large action scenes set in space and around major landmarks in London.

Working titles for this story included Doctor Who and the Gift, The Friendly Invasion, The Axons, and The Vampire from Space. The last title was used through the production of the first two episodes and was only changed by the time filming began on the third. The DVD release contains unused footage and cuts from the story that are packaged with the original title sequence—naming the story as The Vampire from Space. The serial was envisaged to be a six-parter, but the concept of the storyline changed as development progressed.

=== Filming ===
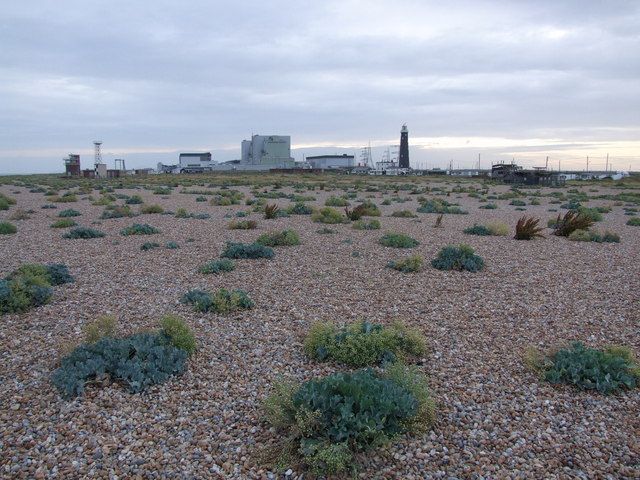
Location shooting took place at Dungeness in Kent

Location shooting was planned to take place over five days in early 1971, starting on 4 January. Filming took place in various locations around Kent, mainly Dungeness.

During the location shooting of the scenes with the tramp, an overnight snow storm necessitated the creation of a line of dialogue in the programme to explain that the variations of weather from shot to shot in these scenes (filmed on various days but supposedly taking place within minutes of each other) are "freak weather conditions" as a result of Axos' arrival.

In some of the car interior scenes the colour-separation overlay (CSO) backgrounds were omitted, leaving the blue screen behind the characters. As Paul Vanezis of the Doctor Who Restoration Team explained in an interview, "they didn't put a background in there [as] it wasn't lit properly. There wasn't enough blue in it to key it, or yellow or green or whatever it was. It was shot wrong. It shouldn't have been shot in the studio and it shouldn't have been shot on xchrome. These days with modern technology you could easily key it... easily, but it wouldn't look right."

The story includes interior scenes inside the TARDIS for the first time in the Pertwee era of the show. The configuration of the TARDIS set-up is unique for this adventure. The TARDIS monitor appears to be a circular screen embedded in one of the 'roundels' in the console room wall, rather than the traditional rectangular screen (this feature is seen again once, a year later, on the unique set built for The Time Monster). The doors of the console room do not open directly into the exterior as in all other adventures; instead they open into a corridor that features the 'roundel' motif. When the TARDIS interior reappears, in the next production (Colony in Space), both these features have been eliminated.

=== Cast notes ===
Bernard Holley had been last seen in The Tomb of the Cybermen (1967). He reprised his role of Axos in the 2011 audio play The Feast of Axos. Peter Bathurst had previously played Hensell in The Power of the Daleks (1966). Tim Pigott-Smith would later play Marco in The Masque of Mandragora (1976). John Hicks who played the Axon Boy, also played one of the Quarks in The Dominators (1968). Fernanda Marlowe reprises her role as Corporal Bell. David Saville previously appeared in The War Games, and would later return for a cameo appearance in The Five Doctors.

== Broadcast and reception ==
| Episode | Title | Run time | Original release date | UK viewers (millions) | Archive |
|---|---|---|---|---|---|
| 1 | "Episode One" | 23:51 | 13 March 1971 | 7.3 | PAL 2" colour videotape |
| 2 | "Episode Two" | 24:00 | 20 March 1971 | 8.0 | RSC converted (NTSC-to-PAL) |
| 3 | "Episode Three" | 24:05 | 27 March 1971 | 6.4 | RSC converted (NTSC-to-PAL) |
| 4 | "Episode Four" | 25:16 | 3 April 1971 | 7.8 | PAL 2" colour videotape |

David J Howe and Stephen James Walker, in their 1998 book Doctor Who: The Television Companion, described The Claws of Axos as "a story that manages to combine an effective alien menace with some excellent location work to present a seamless tale of invasion by stealth". Despite noting that some aspects were unoriginal, they felt that the story was overall "highly imaginative and inventive", with the Axons well realised in production. In 2009, Mark Braxton of Radio Times praised the action, production values, and Delgado's Master, though he noted that there were some "lapses of judgement and quality", and that he was not a fan of Dudley Simpson's electronic score. The A.V. Club reviewer Christopher Bahn wrote that the serial was "entertaining and far from terrible" and the Axons worked in terms of "conceptual horror", but the story suffered from "the badly mishandled subplot about Chinn" and Filer was a "superfluous" character who would have been better if a character who was already established was used in his place. DVD Talk's John Sinnott gave the serial four out of five stars, highlighting the "tight" four-part structure and the rapport between Pertwee and Delgado. He noted that the choice to make the villains "more subtle and devious" was a good departure and the Axons looked "great". Russell Lewin of SFX gave The Claws of Axos three out of five stars, describing the script as "choppy" and with production that struggled to realise its ideas. However, he noted that it would have looked modern when first broadcast and the last episode went in "some interesting directions". In 2010, the magazine named the comedic tramp stumbling upon the Axons as one of the silliest moments in Doctor Who's history.

== Commercial releases ==
=== In print ===
Doctor Who and the Claws of Axos
- Author: Terrance Dicks
- Cover artist: Chris Achilleos
- Series: Doctor Who book: Target novelisations
- Release number: 10
- Publisher: Target Books
- Publication date: 21 April 1977
- ISBN: 0-426-11703-4

A novelisation of this serial, written by Terrance Dicks, was published by Target Books in April 1977. The novel restored material deleted from the TV version, including a "meet-cute" for Jo and Bill Filer, and a suggestion that the Doctor may be attempting to steal Axonite to repair the TARDIS. Pigbin Josh's distinctive dialogue has gone.

=== Home media ===
The original 625-line PAL videotapes of episodes two and three were wiped/destroyed, although some scenes from episode two were found to have survived on an unedited studio-recording block. In 1982, 525-line NTSC copies were returned from Canada.

The story was released on VHS in May 1992. It was later released on Region 2 DVD in April 2005, followed by Region 1 in November. For remastering purposes, the NTSC material was converted back to PAL using Reverse Standards Conversion. In episode two, PAL footage from the studio recording was inserted where possible, although this does result in some noticeable shifts in picture sharpness between scenes. The serial has been included for sale on iTunes since October 2008 and was also released as part of the Doctor Who DVD Files (issue 97) in September 2012.

A Special Edition DVD was released in October 2012, featuring much-improved picture restoration, especially of episodes two and three. The quality of the NTSC material was improved by combining colour from the Reverse Standards Conversion with geometrically corrected picture information from the remastered black-and-white film recordings, and then applying VidFIRE to restore the smooth 'video look'. The special edition adds various new 'extras', including the complete, unedited version of the surviving studio recording.

This story, alongside the rest of Season 8 was released on Blu-ray on 23 February 2021, to coincide with the 50th Anniversary of The Master. It features an extended Episode 1 as a bonus alongside a new restoration of the surviving material.
