= Colony in Space =

058 – Colony in Space
- Doctor Who serial

Cast
- Doctor: Jon Pertwee – Third Doctor
- Companion: Katy Manning – Jo Grant
- Others: Nicholas Courtney – Brigadier Lethbridge-Stewart; Roger Delgado – The Master; Graham Leaman, Peter Forbes-Robertson, John Baker – Time Lords; John Ringham – Ashe; Helen Worth – Mary Ashe; David Webb – Leeson; Sheila Grant – Jane Leeson; John Tordoff – Alec Leeson; Nicholas Pennell – Winton; John Line – Martin; Mitzi Webster – Mrs Martin; Roy Skelton – Norton; Morris Perry – Captain Dent; Bernard Kay – Caldwell; John Herrington – Holden; Tony Caunter – Morgan; Stanley McGeagh – Allen; Pat Gorman – Long/Primitive/Voice; John Scott Martin – Robot; Roy Heymann – Alien Priest; Norman Atkyns – The Guardian

Production
- Directed by: Michael E. Briant
- Written by: Malcolm Hulke
- Script editor: Terrance Dicks
- Produced by: Barry Letts
- Executive producer: None
- Music by: Dudley Simpson
- Production code: HHH
- Series: Season 8
- Running time: 6 episodes, 25 minutes each
- First broadcast: 10 April 1971
- Last broadcast: 15 May 1971

Chronology
← Preceded by The Claws of Axos	Followed by → The Dæmons

Colony in Space is the fourth serial of the eighth season of the British science fiction television series Doctor Who, which was first broadcast in six weekly parts on BBC1 from 10 April to 15 May 1971.

The serial, written by Malcolm Hulke, is set on the mineral-rich human colony world of Uxarieus in 2472. In the serial, the alien time traveller the Third Doctor (Jon Pertwee) and his travelling companion Jo Grant (Katy Manning) are sent by the Time Lords to Uxarieus, where they discover a mining corporation has been faking attacks by monsters on the colonists. The Master (Roger Delgado) later arrives in search of an ancient doomsday weapon created by the natives of the planet.

== Plot ==
Three Time Lords discuss the theft of confidential files relating to "the Doomsday Weapon." They realise that only the Third Doctor can help them, so he is sent to the desert planet of Uxarieus in the year 2472. There he finds an outpost of human colonists struggling to make a living as farmers. The colony's governor, Robert Ashe, welcomes them.

Two colonists die in a reptile attack that night. The Doctor investigates and discovers the deaths are in fact the work of operatives from the Interplanetary Mining Corporation, attempting to scare off the colonists so it can mine the planet for rare minerals. An Adjudicator from Earth is sent for to deal with the complex claims over the planet. The Adjudicator, actually the Master with stolen credentials, rules that the mining company's claim to the planet is stronger. IMC takes over the colony and demands all the colonists leave the planet.

The Master tells the Doctor that the native people of Uxarieus, known as the "primitives," were once an advanced civilisation. Before declining, they built a super-weapon that was never used and the Master wants this weapon for himself. The Doctor rejects the Master's overture to help him rule the galaxy using the weapon. One of the elder natives instructs the Doctor to activate the self-destruct, which he does, and the city begins to crumble.

The colonists now emerge from hiding and kill or overpower the IMC men. Amid the confusion, the Master escapes. With the battle over, the Doctor explains that the radiation from the weapon was what was killing their crops. Earth has agreed to send a real Adjudicator to Uxarieus. The Doctor and Jo return to the TARDIS, returning to UNIT Headquarters mere seconds after it left.

== Production ==
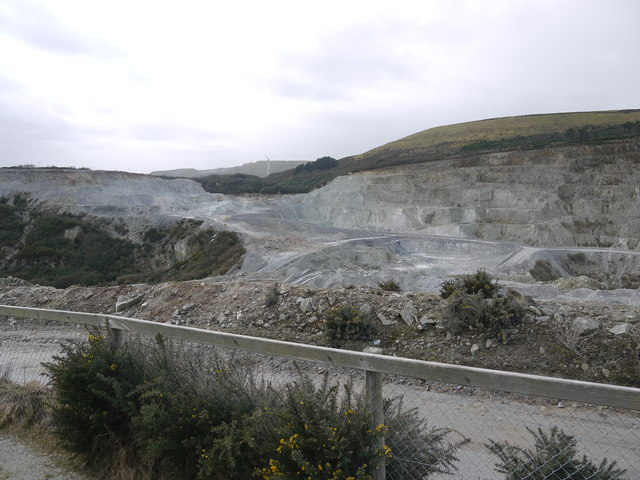
A china clay pit in Cornwall was used to film scenes on the planet Uxarieus

Script editor Terrance Dicks has frequently stated that he disliked the original premise of the Doctor being trapped on Earth, and had meant to subvert this plan as soon as he felt he could get away with it. He recalls in a DVD documentary interview (on the Inferno release) having had it pointed out to him by Malcolm Hulke that the format limited the stories to merely two types: alien invasion and mad scientist.

Exterior scenes on the planet Uxarieus were filmed on location at a clay pit in Carclaze, Cornwall.

Susan Jameson was originally cast as Morgan by Michael E. Briant. However, she was replaced by Tony Caunter when the BBC's Head of Drama Serials made an intervention and decided the role was inappropriate for a woman to perform. Jameson was nevertheless paid in full.

== Themes and analysis ==
The story functions as social commentary – in this instance, the dangers of colonialism. The story, by former Communist Party of Great Britain member Malcolm Hulke, has been described as "unashamedly left wing", with the pioneering colonists and the greedy IMC. As with The Space Pirates (1969), the story can be seen as a Western in space, with the colonists using rifles like cowboys and the Primitives wielding spears in a similar role to Indians.

== Broadcast and reception ==
Episode	Title	Run time	Original release date	UK viewers (millions)	Archive
1	"Episode One"	24:19	10 April 1971	7.6	RSC converted (NTSC-to-PAL)
2	"Episode Two"	22:43	17 April 1971	8.5	RSC converted (NTSC-to-PAL)
3	"Episode Three"	23:47	24 April 1971	9.5	RSC converted (NTSC-to-PAL)
4	"Episode Four"	24:20	1 May 1971	8.1	RSC converted (NTSC-to-PAL)
5	"Episode Five"	25:22	8 May 1971	8.8	RSC converted (NTSC-to-PAL)
6	"Episode Six"	25:22	15 May 1971	8.7	RSC converted (NTSC-to-PAL)

16mm colour film trims of location sequences for the story still exist and short clips from this material was used in the BBC TV special Doctor Who: Thirty Years in the TARDIS (1993).

Paul Cornell, Martin Day, and Keith Topping gave the serial a mixed review in The Discontinuity Guide (1995), writing, "Well meaning, and much more interesting before the Master arrives, at which point it turns from a Hulke political parable into a typical runaround. Rather like watching socially-aware paint dry." In The Television Companion (1998), David J. Howe and Stephen James Walker reprinted some positive reviews from fanzines, but commented that "although the story is indeed refreshing in its setting and contains some interesting ideas and well-drawn characters, it is distinctly short on visual interest and dramatic incident and consequently comes across as being rather dull and lifeless". They felt that the Uxarieus civilisation was flawed and the most exciting moment was the reveal of the Master, though that had already been telegraphed at the beginning of the first episode.

In 2009, Radio Times reviewer Patrick Mulkern described the story as "richly detailed, fast-moving drama that rolls out eventfully over a six-week period", which made it "indigestible" to watch all at once. He praised the structure, which allowed it to not tire in the middle, as well as the supporting cast and the conversation between the Doctor and the Master in the last episode. Dave Golder of SFX, reviewing the DVD release, gave the story three out of five stars. He noted that it had ambition, but was "slow" and "visually uninspired". DVD Talk's John Sinnott rated Colony in Space three out of five stars, describing it as "a decent adventure" with minuses that outweighed the pluses. He noted that the six-episode structure allowed for padding and repeated scenes, but it had "a lot of interesting aspects", such as the Time Lords sending the Doctor, the way the story was constructed, and Pertwee and Delgado's chemistry. In 2010, Charlie Jane Anders of io9 named the cliffhanger to the fourth episode – in which the Master decides to shoot the Doctor – as one of the greatest cliffhangers in Doctor Who.

== Commercial releases ==
=== In print ===
Doctor Who and the Doomsday Weapon
- Author: Malcolm Hulke
- Cover artist: Chris Achilleos
- Series: Doctor Who book: Target novelisations
- Release number: 23
- Publisher: Target Books
- Publication date: April 1974
- ISBN: 0-426-10372-6

A novelisation of this serial, written by Malcolm Hulke, was published by Target Books in April 1974 as Doctor Who and the Doomsday Weapon. This was the first serial of the 1971 series to be so adapted; and so Hulke breaks continuity by having Jo Grant introduced to the Doctor for the first time, even though on television her introduction was in Terror of the Autons (and this would be reflected in the later novelisation of that serial). There is another extensive Malcolm Hulke prologue as an elderly Time Lord describes the Doctor-Master rivalry to his assistant and learns of the theft of the Doomsday Weapon files. There have been Dutch, Turkish, Japanese and Portuguese language editions. An unabridged reading of the novelisation by actor Geoffrey Beevers was released on CD in September 2007 by BBC Audiobooks.

=== Home media ===
Although the PAL mastertapes had been wiped, NTSC copies were returned to the BBC in 1983 from TV Ontario in Canada. In November 2001, this story was released together with The Time Monster, in a VHS tin box set, entitled The Master. A new transfer was made from the converted NTSC to PAL videotapes but no restoration work was carried out for this release.

The story was released on DVD in the UK on 3 October 2011. The single disc release has restored picture quality (unrestored clips, cropped and scanned into 16:9 ratio, can be seen in the "making of" featurette, giving some indication of the amount of work that was done), and contains four seconds which were missing from VHS and US masters of the story, restoring two lines of dialogue. The DVD's special features included an audio commentary, text commentary, out-takes and a retrospective documentary entitled "IMC Needs You" in which cast and crew looked back at the making of the serial.

This story, along with the rest of Season 8 was released on Blu-ray on 23 February 2021, to coincide with the 50th Anniversary of The Master. It features a brand new restoration of the available film and video material. The 2011 DVD-release episodes were included as extras.
