= Jo Grant =

Fictional character from Doctor Who and The Sarah Jane Adventures

- Doctor Who character
- Promotional image of Jo Grant, as portrayed by Katy Manning on Doctor Who
- First appearance: Terror of the Autons (1971)
- Last appearance: Tales of the TARDIS (2023)
- Portrayed by: Katy Manning
- Shared universe appearances: The Sarah Jane Adventures (2010)
- Duration: 1971–1973, 2010, 2022–2023

In-universe information
- Aliases: Josephine Grant; Jo Jones
- Affiliation: Third Doctor; UNIT; Eleventh Doctor
- Spouse: Clifford Jones
- Children: Seven
- Relatives: Unnamed uncle Santiago (grandson); 12 other grandchildren
- Origin: England
- Home: Earth
- Home era: 20th and 21st centuries

Josephine "Jo" Grant, later Jo Jones, is a fictional character played by Katy Manning in the long-running British science fiction television series Doctor Who. Jo was introduced by Barry Letts and Terrance Dicks in the first episode of Doctor Who's eighth season (1971) as a new companion of series protagonist the Doctor, in his third incarnation (Jon Pertwee). After the Doctor's previous companion Liz Shaw (Caroline John), a scientist and intellectual, the production team looked to introduce a less experienced companion to act as an audience surrogate. Jo appeared in 15 stories (77 episodes).

Within the series narrative, Jo is a junior civilian operative for United Nations Intelligence Taskforce, an international organisation that defends the Earth from alien threats, assigned as an assistant to the Doctor, who is initially stranded on Earth. Once he regains use of his time machine, the TARDIS, she accompanies him in travels across time and space. Jo departs the Doctor's company in the 1973 television serial The Green Death having fallen in love with a human professor. On television, she next encounters the Doctor over thirty-seven years later in the 2010 Sarah Jane Adventures serial Death of the Doctor.

Manning and Pertwee enjoyed a close working relationship; Manning felt this added to the success of the partnership between Jo and the Third Doctor. Though her character was criticised for not being a progressive interpretation of a woman, Manning felt both that feminism was not a contemporary concern and Jo had her virtues aside from her intelligence, such as her loyalty. The character's exit is generally considered one of the emotional high points of Doctor Who's 1963–1989 run; Russell T Davies felt pressure to remain true to this exit when re-introducing the character in 2010 for The Sarah Jane Adventures.

== Appearances ==
=== Television ===
Jo first appears in the 1971 serial Terror of the Autons, having been assigned to the Doctor (Jon Pertwee) as a replacement for Liz Shaw (Caroline John). Apparently, she gained the assignment to UNIT because her uncle, a high ranking civil servant, had "pulled some strings". Brigadier Lethbridge-Stewart (Nicholas Courtney) assigns her to the Doctor, who is initially dismayed when he finds out that she is not a scientist, but accepts her because he does not have the heart to tell her otherwise. An enthusiastic, bubbly and sometimes scatter-brained blonde, Jo soon endears herself to the other members of UNIT, especially Captain Mike Yates (Richard Franklin) and Sergeant Benton (John Levene). The Third Doctor is also particularly attached to her, and she is devoted to him, refusing to leave his side even where mortal danger is involved.

There is plenty of danger to go around as well, especially after the Time Lords restore the Third Doctor's ability to travel through time and space. Jo faces the hazards and wonders of travel with the Doctor with courage and plucky determination. Together with the Doctor and UNIT, she encounters such perils as killer daffodils, time-eating monsters, and renegade Time Lord the Master (Roger Delgado). She faces the Doctor's most prominent foes, the Daleks, on two separate occasions. She is miniaturised, hypnotised, flung through time, nearly aged to death, and menaced by giant maggots and ancient dæmons. Over time, Jo also grows more confident and mature, until she is independent enough to stand up to the Doctor, which she does in her last serial, The Green Death in May–June 1973. During the events of that story, Jo falls in love with Professor Clifford Jones (Stewart Bevan), a young, Nobel Prize-winning scientist leading an environmentalist group. At the end, she agrees to marry Jones and go with him to the Amazon to study its vegetation, the news of which the Doctor greets with a mixture of pride and sadness.

Jo Grant (now Jo Jones) returned in two episodes of the fourth series of The Sarah Jane Adventures in Death of the Doctor (2010), meeting her successor companion Sarah Jane Smith (Elisabeth Sladen) for the first time, and subsequently the Eleventh Doctor (Matt Smith). The two attend a memorial service for the Doctor, but later learn aliens faked his death in order to steal the TARDIS using Jo and Sarah Jane's memories. Jo is still married, has seven children and twelve grandchildren, and travels with her grandson Santiago (Finn Jones); she is envious of Sarah Jane for having had several Doctor encounters since her departure, but has herself led a fulfilling life travelling the world promoting humanitarian and ecological causes. Ultimately, Jo and Sarah Jane's memories of their time with the Doctor are what defeat an alien plot to steal the TARDIS. After returning her to London, the Doctor discloses to Jo that he secretly visited her during the events of "The End of Time," having checked on all of his previous companions before regenerating into the Eleventh Doctor.

Manning reprised the role of Jo for a cameo appearance in "The Power of the Doctor" (2022), as part of a support group of former companions that share their experiences of life with the Doctor.

=== Other media ===
The Seventh Doctor encounters an alternate version of Jo in the Virgin New Adventures novel Blood Heat in an alternate timeline where the Third Doctor was killed and the Silurians have conquered Earth (Doctor Who and the Silurians). A middle-aged Jo is featured in the spin-off novel Genocide, by Paul Leonard, where she and Jones have a son named Matthew and are divorced, Jo collaborating with the Eighth Doctor and his current companion Samantha Jones to avert a plot to erase the human race from history. Alternatively, text stories in a UNIT-orientated special issue of Doctor Who Magazine, written as in-universe articles, state that Jo, her husband Clifford and their eight-year-old daughter Katy "now" live in North Wales and she is standing for Parliament as a Green Party candidate. Jo's appearance in Genocide was highlighted in a trailer for the re-launched Doctor Who range which was included on a number of BBC videos in 1997–78. The trailer used a clip from Frontier in Space to illustrate Jo. She briefly appears in the novel Sometime Never... as one of several companions abducted by current villains the Council of Eight, who sustain themselves by draining energy from the potential timelines of the Doctor's friends, the novel depicting her abduction and return to Earth after the Doctor defeats the Council.

Manning has also reprised the role of Jo in three "announcement trailers" for the Blu-ray releases of the eighth, ninth and tenth seasons of Doctor Who on the series' official YouTube channel. Each trailer depicts Jo in the present day as she encounters an iconic monster from each season: the giant maggots from The Green Death in the season 10 trailer, the Autons in the season 8 trailer and the Sea Devils in the season 9 trailer. Stewart Bevan also returns as Clifford in the season 8 and 10 trailers; however, after Bevan's death in 2022, Manning appears alone in the trailer for season 9, in which Jo mourns the loss of her husband.

== Conceptual history ==
=== Doctor Who (1971–73) ===
For his first series, producer Barry Letts had primarily worked on stories inherited from the previous production team. When it came to assessing his and script editor Terrance Dicks' approach to the next series, they identified a need to replace the Doctor's assistant, for the purposes of exposition and audience identification. Previous companion Liz Shaw had been conceived as a brilliant scientist who could discuss matters with the Doctor on an equal footing; the replacement would be younger and more naive, someone who could ask, "Doctor, what's all this about?" An early memo described Grant as "Not a scientist, though with enough basic background to understand what's going on. Other sources, including Barry Letts, have said there was an initial idea to make the character more 'exotic' with a tougher, sexier edge, but not academically brilliant, so as to give the Doctor the much-wanted (by Pertwee) chance to play the father figure. Along with the Brigadier's new second in command, Captain Mike Yates, the character of Jo Grant was inspired by the male–female companion pairing of Jamie McCrimmon and Victoria Waterfield, whom Letts had previously directed, with the intention of a possible romantic subplot for the two. Manning stated in a 1998 interview with SFX however, that "With Jon and I there was no need to put any love interests into the show because there was this closeness between Jo and the Doctor, and there was no room for them to have anything else going."

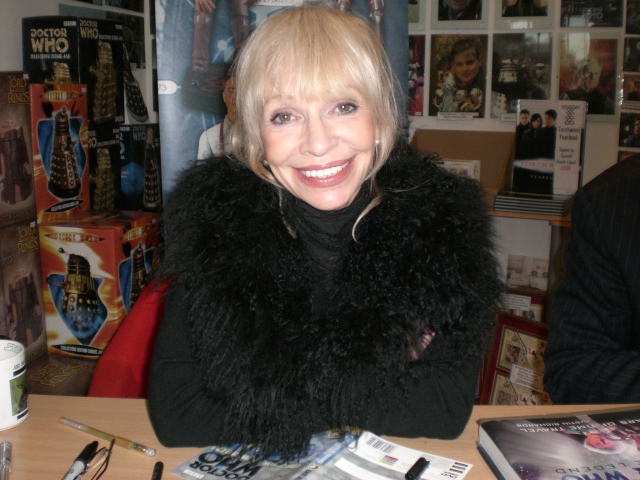
Jon Pertwee reportedly identified Katy Manning (pictured) as the "perfect actress" for the role.

Letts and Dicks also intended that Jo Grant would be cast so as to go beyond the stereotype of a "pretty doll... who can just stand there and scream." They settled on young actress Katy Manning, whose personality had impressed in an otherwise shambolic audition. Others shortlisted for the part included Yutte Stensgaard, Shakira Baksh, Jenny McCracken, Cheryl Hall, and Gabrielle Drake. According to the commentary provided by Letts for the DVD release of Terror of the Autons, Rula Lenska and Anouska Hempel also auditioned for the role. The same DVD notes that Pertwee himself had spotted Manning in the lobby of the BBC TV Centre, but had not known who she was. He told Letts he had seen the "perfect actress" for the role, but Letts was unaware of who he was extolling. When Letts cast Manning and introduced her to the show's star, Pertwee was delighted and said "I told you she was the girl for the part". Both Jenny McCracken and Cheryl Hall explain on the DVD commentary for the "Special Edition" of Carnival of Monsters, that they were on the final shortlist of six actresses for the part of Jo, losing out to Manning. Barry Letts cast them both in Carnival of Monsters as a direct consequence of their auditions.

Like previous companions, Manning's character was clothed in contemporaneous fashions and attitudes, providing reference points for the audience of a science fiction series that could not incorporate events of the day. Similar to Pertwee's Doctor, Jo Grant was an "action-style" character, with the actress performing some of her own stunts — understandably so, given that her diminutive stature could not easily be doubled by a male stunt performer — though it is debatable whether the character fully broke any stereotypes. Reflecting on her appearances, Manning stated that feminism "wouldn't have been discussed around my era" and was not a concern in the depiction of Jo. She felt Jo provided a good contrast to the Doctor's intellectual confidence; she is able to handle a situation one moment before acting irrational the next, this made it "exciting for everybody". Manning felt that though "academia was not her strong point...loyalty was" stating that the character would "go through hell and high water for any of the UNIT group". Piers D. Britton, a writer of reference works of Doctor Who felt that Jo's characterisation posited her as subordinate to the Doctor; for example she encourages "the assumption that she is his ward". Jo's romantic interest, Clifford Jones, in The Green Death is posited both as "a younger counterpart to the Doctor" and "his 'appropriate' replacement within the heteronormative order".

=== The Sarah Jane Adventures (2010) ===
In April 2010, it was announced in a press release that the character would return in an episode of the fourth series of the Doctor Who spin-off The Sarah Jane Adventures, also guest-starring Matt Smith (the Eleventh Doctor). Elisabeth Sladen, who portrayed the lead role of Sarah Jane Smith in the spin-off, indicated that she was "delighted to be working with [Manning]", having known the actress for a very long time (Sladen's Sarah Jane Smith was the successor to Manning's Jo Grant during the Third Doctor era in 1973). Manning was surprised but very pleased to be asked to appear in the Doctor Who spin-off; playing Jo again was something she had "never really considered". Doctor Who 2005–2010 executive producer and creator of The Sarah Jane Adventures Russell T Davies later indicated in an interview with Doctor Who Magazine that Jo's return would be more than a "cameo", and a "full-blooded" appearance.

Davies felt pressure to remain true to the original character of Jo. In an interview with SFX he stated that he watched old episodes of the show "for the first time ever" in planning a story within the Doctor Who universe. He wanted to "preserve the absolute beauty of what Barry Letts and Terrance Dicks did" with Manning's last Doctor Who story, The Green Death. Manning was "surprised at how it all came back" and felt that Davies had "done a wonderful job of showing how Jo has developed over the years". She felt that Jo was still "the young and awestruck girl she was" but "tempered by experience and maturity." Davies expressed his contention that the character had been left "with the promise of happiness, of adventure, of love and joy" and it would be wrong to interfere with that.

=== Tales of the Tardis (2023) ===
Drawn into a Memory Tardis, Jo reunites with Clyde Langer (Daniel Anthony), whom she met during her appearance on The Sarah Jane Adventures, to discuss her time with the Doctor and the events of The Three Doctors, comparing her friendship with the Third Doctor to Clyde's with Sarah Jane Smith. The off-screen voice of Stewart Bevan at the end of the episode suggests Jo's late husband Cliff has now joined her.

== Media impact and reception ==
In his 2005 book, Inside the Tardis: The Worlds of Doctor Who, James Chapman described Jo as a reversion to "the screaming bimbo type" as a "well-meaning but accident prone dolly bird". He claims however, that Manning's "engaging personality and 'kooky' sex appeal... made her one of the most popular Doctor Who companions". The character remains remembered for this sex appeal, particularly in light of a naked photoshoot in the magazine Girl Illustrated with a Dalek prop which Chapman states "gave her an extra-diegetic significance in the popular history of Doctor Who". Lester Haines from the British technology news and opinion website, The Register, stated in light of a similar (clothed) photoshoot Kylie Minogue did in 2007 to promote her role as Astrid Peth that she was "unlikely to replace Katy Manning in veteran fans' affections".

In an online poll conducted by the Radio Times in 2010, with over 3,000 participants, Jo was voted the ninth most popular companion out of forty-eight options. Gavin Fuller of The Daily Telegraph listed Jo as the eighth best companion in Doctor Who history, describing her as a "perfect foil" and "insanely loyal". He additionally felt that she and the Third Doctor had "one of the warmest Doctor-companion pairings of the original series, as clearly seen in her leaving scene". In 2011, Mark Harrison of Den of Geek listed the character's exit as the third greatest companion farewell scene, stating it to be "the most emotional in Jon Pertwee's era" and "a bittersweet exit for one of the most popular companions." Will Salmon of SFX similarly listed Jo's departure as the fourth greatest farewell, noting how it was the first time the Doctor was "truly upset" since leaving Susan. Russell T. Davies believed that emotional moments such as Jo's departure were strongly defined in Doctor Who' original 1963–89 run; being "so memorable [to fans] simply because they are the only tiny emotional moments in the entire output".

Fraser McAlpine, reviewing Jo's appearances as companion for BBC America's Anglophenia blog felt to succeed as a foil to the "aloof" Third Doctor, having "the charm of nowadays on her side". He felt that Manning portrayed Jo's "mixed up innocence beautifully" and felt that her departure illustrated the Doctor's innate loneliness. The A.V. Club's Christopher Bahn stated that Jo was "one of [his] favorites", but that, despite her "sweet and daffy charm", she was "a big step backwards" from her predecessor Liz Shaw in terms of pairing the Doctor with someone equal. Discussing Jo's return in The Sarah Jane Adventures serial Death of the Doctor, Ian Berriman of SFX magazine thought that "Davies nails the character the moment she walks through the door – clumsy, babbling, sweet-natured". He felt that "It's really good to have her back" and stated the interaction between Jo and Sarah Jane to be "a treat".
