= Terror of the Autons =

055 – Terror of the Autons
- Doctor Who serial

Cast
- Doctor: Jon Pertwee – Third Doctor
- Companion: Katy Manning – Jo Grant
- Others: Nicholas Courtney – Brigadier Lethbridge-Stewart; Richard Franklin – Captain Mike Yates; John Levene – Sergeant Benton; Roger Delgado – The Master; David Garth – Time Lord; Michael Wisher – Rex Farrel; Stephen Jack – Farrel Snr.; Barbara Leake – Mrs. Farrel; Harry Towb – McDermott; Christopher Burgess – Professor Philips; Frank Mills – Radio Telescope Director; Andrew Staines – Goodge; Dermot Tuohy – Brownrose; John Baskcomb – Rossini; Roy Stewart – Tony the Strong Man; Dave Carter – Museum Attendant; Pat Gorman – Auton Leader; Terry Walsh – Auton Policeman; Haydn Jones – Auton Voice; Norman Stanley – Telephone Mechanic

Production
- Directed by: Barry Letts (uncredited)
- Written by: Robert Holmes
- Script editor: Terrance Dicks
- Produced by: Barry Letts
- Music by: Dudley Simpson
- Production code: EEE
- Series: Season 8
- Running time: 4 episodes, 25 minutes each
- First broadcast: 2 January 1971
- Last broadcast: 23 January 1971

Chronology
← Preceded by Inferno	Followed by → The Mind of Evil

Terror of the Autons is the first serial of the eighth season of the British science fiction television series Doctor Who. It was broadcast in four weekly parts on BBC1 from 2 to 23 January 1971.

The serial is set in various locations in England. In the serial, the alien time traveller the Third Doctor and the organisation UNIT work to stop the Master, a renegade Time Lord just like the Doctor, from using a radio telescope to summon an invasion force of the incorporeal intelligence the Nestenes to Earth. The serial introduced three new characters: the Doctor's new companion, Jo Grant; his archenemy the Master; and Captain Mike Yates.

== Plot ==
The Master arrives on Earth, steals a surviving Nestene energy unit, then hijacks a radio telescope, using it to channel energy into the Nestene unit, and kidnaps Professor Philips, a research scientist. Reports of the theft and sabotage bring the Doctor, his new assistant Jo Grant and the Brigadier to investigate. There the Doctor encounters a fellow Time Lord, who warns him of the Master's arrival.

The Master next takes over Farrel Autoplastics, a nearby factory. Jo, investigating local plastics factories, finds the Master, but he hypnotises her and wipes her memory of their meeting. He sends her back to UNIT with a box ostensibly containing the stolen energy unit, but the Doctor realises she has been hypnotised and forced to deliver a bomb.

UNIT trace the missing Professor to Rossini's Circus, which the Doctor visits. He is captured by Rossini, but freed by Jo. The Doctor removes something from the Master's TARDIS. He is then attacked by Rossini and his men, only to be "rescued" by Autons disguised as policemen. Fleeing, the Doctor and Jo hide in a nearby quarry until UNIT arrive. As UNIT fight the Autons, the Doctor's party escape. Meanwhile, a large group of Autons disguised in Carnival masks tour the country handing out plastic daffodils: soon deaths from asphyxiation, shock and heart failure are being reported nationwide.

The Master infiltrates UNIT headquarters, disguised as a telephone engineer. At the Autoplastics factory, the Brigadier and the Doctor discover that Farrel, the owner, has chartered a coach, and discover a lurking killer Auton that ties-in the factory with the Master. At UNIT headquarters, the plastic flower and the plastic telephone cable try to kill Jo and the Doctor, respectively, but are foiled.

The Master breaks into UNIT HQ. The Doctor reveals that he has possession of the Master's dematerialisation circuit, threatening to destroy it: but the Master uses Jo as a hostage. He takes them both to the quarry, but Farrel, struggling to break free of his hypnosis, unexpectedly causes a diversion during which the Doctor and Jo escape.

UNIT engage the Autons, and the Doctor convinces the Master that the Nestenes will not distinguish between him and the humans once they arrive. Together, they use the radio telescope channel to force the Nestene energy back into space. The Autons collapse. The Master flees, then re-emerges, apparently surrendering. When he pulls out a gun, Yates shoots him, but the Doctor peels back a facemask to reveal it is only the hypnotised Farrel in disguise. The real Master escapes in the coach. However, without his dematerialisation circuit, the Master is now trapped on Earth.

== Production ==
Working titles for this story included The Spray of Death. The Autons were brought back because they had been popular in their first appearance the previous year in Spearhead from Space (1970).

For the new season, producer Barry Letts and script editor Terrance Dicks wanted to add new characters. They thought about how the Brigadier was like Dr. Watson to the Doctor's Sherlock Holmes, and decided to devise a new character, the Master, to emulate Moriarty. The Master was meant to specifically contrast with Pertwee's Doctor; the Doctor was authoritative while the Master was charming, though he used that for an evil purpose. Terror of the Autons also introduced Katy Manning as Jo Grant (as a replacement for departed companion Liz Shaw), and Richard Franklin as Captain Mike Yates.

The scene at the start of Episode Three, where an Auton is hit by a car and tumbles off a cliff, was quite real. Dinny Powell was driving the vehicle in place of actor Richard Franklin, and stuntman Terry Walsh, playing the Auton, fell further down the slope than intended, being injured in the mishap. He nevertheless got back to his feet in the same take, as planned. Letts requested that a sequence near the story's ending, in which Yates yells to the Doctor, "We've got him now!", be reshot because Franklin's performance was too over-the-top. Franklin was grateful for this.

On the first day of filming, Katy Manning injured all the ligaments in her foot when jumping out of a car and running across a quarry. She also formed a fast bond with Barry Letts, as she was fond of the animals used in the serial. Nicholas Courtney was also ill on the first day, so was replaced by a double in those quarry scenes.

=== Casting ===
Michael Wisher, the young Rex Farrel, had also done uncredited voice work on Seeds, and had previously appeared in The Ambassadors of Death (as the TV News anchorman) and, later, Carnival of Monsters (as the machiavellian politician Kalik). He went on to do various Dalek voices (in Planet of the Daleks and Death to the Daleks), and became well known as the first actor to play the evil genius Davros in Genesis of the Daleks. His final appearance was as a member of the crew of the Morestran Probe in Planet of Evil.

Harry Towb, who plays McDermott, had previously appeared in The Seeds of Death (1969). Roy Stewart previously appeared as Toberman in The Tomb of the Cybermen (1967). Andrew Staines who plays Goodge was a sergeant in The Enemy of the World (1968). Christopher Burgess who plays Professor Philips was also in The Enemy of the World (1968) playing the role of Swann.

Although credited on-screen, Bill McGuirk does not actually appear; his entire contribution was edited out prior to transmission. He had previously appeared in The Enemy of the World (1968).

== Broadcast and reception ==
Episode	Title	Run time	Original release date	UK viewers (millions)	Archive
1	"Episode One"	24:36	2 January 1971	7.3	PAL D3 colour restoration
2	"Episode Two"	24:48	9 January 1971	8.0	PAL D3 colour restoration
3	"Episode Three"	23:28	16 January 1971	8.1	PAL D3 colour restoration
4	"Episode Four"	22:10	23 January 1971	8.4	PAL D3 colour restoration

Certain scenes in the serial, particularly the killer doll and the Auton policemen, caused controversy in the press as being too frightening for children. In an unconnected House of Lords debate about the effect of mass media on the public, the serial was cited as an example of a programme that might be too 'scary' for younger children.

Jon Pertwee would later state that he thought the story was "excellent" and "one of the best we ever did." Paul Cornell, Martin Day, and Keith Topping simply wrote of the serial in The Discontinuity Guide (1995), "Functional and memorably scary, but by no means an Auton story." In The Television Companion (1998), David J. Howe and Stephen James Walker called it a "strong start" to the season, though they commented that the story was not as effective as Spearhead from Space in "depicting the threat of the Autons." They praised the introduction of the Master, calling him "the most interesting character to have been introduced to the series since the Doctor himself", though they found it improbable that one comment from the Doctor would persuade him to change his plan. Howe and Walker also praised Letts' direction, though they found that the over-use of CSO caused some scenes to "look false and strained".

In 2009, Patrick Mulkern of Radio Times compared the serial to a comic strip and wrote positively about Manning and Delgado. However, he noted that there were "plot holes" and "gaudy early '70s production values". Ian Berriman of SFX, reviewing the serial for its 2011 DVD release, also commented that Delgado was "note-perfect from the off" and that while the climax was "feeble", he felt "it's all such outrageous fun that it doesn't really matter". DVD Talk reviewer John Sinnott described Terror of the Autons as "a wonderful romp," although "the ending is rushed and pretty much just pulled out of nowhere". Sinnott particularly praised the Doctor and the Master, as well as the "subtle humor". Den of Geek's James Peatly wrote that Terror of the Autons was "a fantastically entertaining and incredibly confident slice of macabre fun". He was positive toward the family tone, Jo, and the Master but felt that it "lacks some of the narrative cohesion" of Spearhead from Space and "the Autons are reduced to playing the role of foot soldiers to the Master". In 2009, SFX named the cliffhanger to Episode Two, in which the policeman is revealed to be an Auton, as the 20th scariest moment in Doctor Who.

== Commercial releases ==
=== In print ===
Doctor Who and the Terror of the Autons
- Author: Terrance Dicks
- Cover artist: Peter Brookes
- Series: Doctor Who book: Target novelisations
- Release number: 63
- Publisher: Target Books
- Publication date: 15 May 1975
- ISBN: 0-426-10639-3

A novelisation of this serial, written by Terrance Dicks, was published by Target Books in May 1975. The cover art by Achilleos depicts what is supposed to be a fully developed Nestene, though this was never actually seen in the serial itself. The novelisation was reissued in 1979 with a new cover by Alan Hood.

The novelisation introduces Jo Grant, although Malcolm Hulke's Colony in Space novelisation (titled Doctor Who and The Doomsday Weapon) had already done so – albeit in contradiction to the television programme. The Master and the Doctor are revealed herein (borrowing from The Making of Doctor Who by Malcolm Hulke and Terrance Dicks, published in 1972) to have names that are mathematical formulae, and the grenade the Master uses is identified (again, contrary to the television programme) as Sontaran.

An unabridged reading of the novelisation by actor Geoffrey Beevers was released on CD on 7 July 2010 by BBC Audiobooks.

=== Home media ===
Although the BBC wiped the serial's original 625-line videotapes for reuse, they kept 16mm b/w telerecording film prints. In 1993, these prints were combined with the colour signal from an off-air 525-line NTSC domestic videotape recording, resulting in relatively high-quality colour masters for a VHS release. A short clip from Episode One, depicting the Doctor's first meeting with Jo Grant, still survives in its original 625-line format, on a clip reel prepared for a 1973 edition of the news show Nationwide. The short Nationwide clip is presented on the DVD of The Aztecs, in a featurette discussing the VidFIRE restoration process.

As of 5 August 2008, this serial has been included for sale on iTunes. It was released on DVD in 2011 in a boxset entitled Mannequin Mania with the special edition of Spearhead from Space. The Nationwide clip is incorporated into Episode one; the rest of the serial consists of restored footage. Comparison between the remastered episodes and clips included in the behind-the-scenes material demonstrate that a great deal of restoration work has been carried out on the picture and sound quality.

The story was released on DVD again in 2013, included in a set paired with "The End of Time" (a two-part Tenth Doctor David Tennant story from 2009/10), in "The Monster Collection" series, specifically "The Master" entry.

This story, along with the rest of Season 8 was released on Blu-ray on 23 February 2021, to coincide with the 50th Anniversary of The Master. It features a new 5.1 sound mix, optional updated special effects, CSO clean up and a brand new restoration of the film prints.
