= Pat Gorman =

English actor (1933–2018)

- Gorman in 1981
- Born: William Patrick Gorman; 10 May 1933; London, England
- Died: 9 October 2018 (aged 85); Ruislip, London, England
- Occupation: Actor
- Children: 1

William Patrick Gorman (10 May 1933 – 9 October 2018) was an English actor known in particular for his many small roles in the science fiction programme Doctor Who.

== Early life ==
Gorman was born in the East End of London on March 10, 1933. His parents died before he was five, and he was raised by his grandmother. He later served in the army and work in Canada as a miner and logger before returning to London to help look after his widowed grandmother. He got into acting after a chance meeting with an agent looking for extras and stuntmen while Gorman was working at a market.

== Career ==
Despite never appearing in a starring role, Gorman appeared in minor roles in a large number of films and television productions, including The Elephant Man, Z-Cars, Fawlty Towers, I, Claudius and Blake's 7. He also played the killer in the television series The Nightmare Man.

He appeared in minor roles in 83 episodes of the science fiction series Doctor Who between 1964 and 1985: only six other actors appeared in more in the show's original run. Toby Hadoke's obituary in Doctor Who Magazine called Gorman "the unknown soldier of Doctor Who" in tribute to the many small roles he played throughout the first decades of the show, many in full costume as aliens or monsters. These roles include: a Silurian in The Silurians (1970); a Primitive in Colony in Space (1971); a Sea Devil in The Sea Devils (1972). and a pilot in The Armageddon Factor (1979). Although he worked frequently and had a reputation as a reliable actor willing to take on any task, he did not seek the limelight and gave few interviews. One of these was with David Banks, author of the book Cyberman, in which he said that playing one of the giant robot monsters in 1968's The Invasion was very enjoyable: "There was a great feeling of power when we walked down the steps of St. Paul's."

== Death ==
Gorman died on 9 October 2018 in Ruislip, London, England after a short illness. He was survived by his wife, Vera, and daughter Jackie.

== Filmography ==
=== Film ===
Year	Title	Role	Notes
1962	Time to Remember	Police Constable	Uncredited
1963	Siege of the Saxons	Rebel	Uncredited
1963	Girl in the Headlines	PC who is holding Man in Club	Uncredited
1963	The Fast Lady	Fireman	Uncredited
1963	The Victors	American Soldier	Uncredited
1963	Heavens Above!	Townsman	Uncredited
1964	Carry On Jack	Pirate	Uncredited
1964	Blind Corner	Studio Engineer	Uncredited
1964	The Curse of the Mummy's Tomb	London Reporter	Uncredited
1964	The Leather Boys	Man in Pub	Uncredited
1964	A Hard Day's Night	Pub Patron Playing Shove Ha'Penn	Uncredited
1967	The Mummy's Shroud	Reporter	Uncredited
1967	I'll Never Forget What's'isname	Old Edgcumbian	Uncredited
1967	The Mummy's Shroud	Reporter	Uncredited
1970	Trog	Army Officer	Uncredited
1971	Assault	Police Constable	Uncredited
1977	Star Wars	Stormtrooper	Uncredited
1978	The Big Sleep	Pool Player in Pub	Uncredited
1978	The Playbirds	Expert 3	
1978	The Thirty Nine Steps	Cab Driver	Uncredited
1980	The Elephant Man	Fairground Bobby	
1981	Ragtime	Thug No. 2	
1981	Venom	Policeman	Uncredited
1982	The Boys in Blue	Radio Room PC	Uncredited
1985	Christmas Present	ITN Crewman	Uncredited
1986	Tai-Pan	British Merchant #2	
1988	A Fish Called Wanda	Man at Airport	Uncredited
1989	Batman	Cop at Axis Chemicals	Uncredited

=== Television ===
Year	Title	Episode	Role	Notes
1962	The Edgar Wallace Mystery Theater	Time To Remember	Police Constable	
1963	Maigret	The Log of the Cap Fagnet	Extra	Uncredited
1963	The Saint	The Benevolent Burglary	Gendarme	Uncredited
1964-1985	Doctor Who	105 episodes	Various	See below for detailed filmography
1964	Story Parade	The Man Who Won The Pools	Reporter	
1964	The Four Seasons of Rosie Carr	Spring at the Winged Horse	Sailor	
1964	The Count of Monte Christo	Dishonour	Party Guest	
1965	Danger Man	Such Man Are Dangerous	Annex Guard	
1965-1976	BBC Play of the Month	2 episodes	Various	
1966-1967	Adam Adamant Lives !	5 episodes	Various	
1966-1969	Softly, Softly	3 episodes	Various	
1967	The Forsyte Saga	N/A	Man in crowd	
1967	The Prisoner	Hammer Into Anvil	Hospital Orderly	
1969	Dad's Army	Room at the Bottom	Southgate Platoon Soldier	
1970	Germinal	Mutual Aid	Miner	
1970	Ivanhoe	Hunted	First Norman Soldier	
1970	As Good Cooks Go	Tummy Troubles	Escorting Policeman	
1970	W. Somerset Maugham	Jane	Waiter	
1970	Doomwatch	Hear No Evil	Man	
1970	Dixon of Dock Green	Waste Land	Policeman	
1970	The Roads to Freedom	Episode 1.9	Guard	
1970	The Doctors	2 episodes	Assistant	
1970-1976	Softly, Softly: Task Force	7 episodes	Various	

=== Doctor Who ===
Year	Title	Role	Notes
1964	The Dalek Invasion of Earth	Male Freedom Fighter	uncredited
1965	Mission to the Unknown	Planetarian	uncredited
1965	The Myth Makers	Greek Soldier	uncredited
1966	The Massacre of St Bartholomew's Eve	Guard	uncredited
1966	The War Machines	Worker; Soldier	uncredited
1966–67	The Highlanders	English Sailor	uncredited
1967	The Abominable Snowmen	Warrior Monk	uncredited
1967–68	The Enemy of the World	Guard on Fire Escape	uncredited
1968	The Invasion	Cyberman	
1969	The Seeds of Death	Technician	uncredited
1969	The War Games	Military Policeman	
1970	Doctor Who and the Silurians	Silurian; Silurian Scientist	
1970	The Ambassadors of Death	Technician	uncredited
1970	Inferno	Primord	
1971	Terror of the Autons	Auton Leader	
1971	Colony in Space	Primitive; Long; Scientist	
1971	The Dæmons	Coven Member	uncredited
1972	Day of the Daleks	Guard; Film Cameraman	uncredited
1972	The Sea Devils	Sea Devil	
1972–73	The Three Doctors	UNIT Soldier	uncredited
1973	Frontier in Space	Presidential Guard; Sea Devil	uncredited
1973	The Green Death	Security Guard; Wholeweal Man	uncredited
1974	Invasion of the Dinosaurs	UNIT Corporal	
1974	The Monster of Peladon	Guard	uncredited
1974	Planet of the Spiders	Soldier; Villager	uncredited
1974–75	Robot	Think Tank Guard	uncredited
1975	Genesis of the Daleks	Thal Soldier	
1975	Revenge of the Cybermen	Cyberman; Dead Crew Member	uncredited
1976	The Seeds of Doom	Guard	uncredited
1976	The Masque of Mandragora	Soldier; Brethren Member	uncredited
1976	The Deadly Assassin	Guard	uncredited
1977	The Invisible Enemy	Medic	
1978	The Ribos Operation	Kro	uncredited
1979	The Armageddon Factor	Pilot	
1979	City of Death	Thug	uncredited
1981	Warriors' Gate	Gundan	uncredited
1981	The Keeper of Traken	Foster	uncredited
1982	Time-Flight	Policeman	uncredited
1983	Enlightenment	Grogan	uncredited
1984	The Caves of Androzani	Soldier	uncredited
1985	Attack of the Cybermen	Worker; Cyberman; Rogue Cyberman	uncredited
