= The Dæmons =

059 – The Dæmons
- Doctor Who serial

Cast
- Doctor: Jon Pertwee – Third Doctor
- Companion: Katy Manning – Jo Grant
- Others: Nicholas Courtney – Brigadier Lethbridge-Stewart; Richard Franklin – Captain Mike Yates; John Levene – Sergeant Benton; Roger Delgado – The Master; Stephen Thorne – Azal; Stanley Mason – Bok; Damaris Hayman – Miss Hawthorne; Robin Wentworth – Prof. Horner; David Simeon – Alastair Fergus; Alec Linstead – Sgt Osgood; Rollo Gamble – Winstanley; Don McKillop – Bert the Landlord; John Joyce – Garvin; Jon Croft – Tom Girton; Matthew Corbett – Jones; James Snell – Harry; Christopher Wray – PC Groom; Eric Hillyard – Dr Reeves; John Owens – Thorpe; Gerald Taylor – Baker's Man; The Headington Quarry Men – Morris Dancers

Production
- Directed by: Christopher Barry
- Written by: "Guy Leopold" (Barry Letts and Robert Sloman)
- Script editor: Terrance Dicks
- Produced by: Barry Letts
- Executive producer: None
- Music by: Dudley Simpson
- Production code: JJJ
- Series: Season 8
- Running time: 5 episodes, 25 minutes each
- First broadcast: 22 May 1971
- Last broadcast: 19 June 1971

Chronology
| ← Preceded by Colony in Space | Followed by → Day of the Daleks |

The Dæmons is the fifth and final serial of the eighth season of the British science fiction television series Doctor Who, which was first broadcast in five weekly parts on BBC1 from 22 May to 19 June 1971.

In the serial, the alien time traveller the Master (Roger Delgado) awakens the ancient horned alien Azal (Stephen Thorne) in a cavern beneath an English church, with the Master intending to be granted Azal's immense power.

== Plot ==
In the village of Devil's End, an archaeological dig is excavating the infamous Devil's Hump, a Bronze Age burial mound. A local white witch, Olive Hawthorne arrives to protest, warning of great evil and the coming of the horned beast, but she is dismissed as a crank. After watching a television broadcast about the dig the Third Doctor tells Jo that Miss Hawthorne is right – the dig must be stopped, and so the two make preparations to depart.

Miss Hawthorne goes to see the new local vicar, the Reverend Magister who is the Master – he tries to assure her that her fears are unfounded, but his hypnosis fails to overcome her will. Backed by a group of followers, the Master is conducting ceremonies in the cavern below the Church to summon up Azal, a force of evil. The Doctor and Jo reach the mound and the Doctor rushes inside to stop the dig, but it is too late. The tomb door opens and icy gusts of wind rush out, freezing both the leader of the dig and the Doctor, while a stone gargoyle, Bok, seemingly comes alive.

The leader of the dig perishes, but the Doctor somehow recovers, presumably due to his alien physiology. Captain Mike Yates and Sergeant Benton arrive at the village the following morning, but the Brigadier, arriving later, finds himself unable to enter the village, as there is an invisible dome-shaped barrier, 10 miles in diameter and one mile high, surrounding it that causes anything trying to enter to heat up and burst into flame. He contacts Yates and is briefed on the situation while the Doctor and Jo return to the dig where they find a small spaceship in the mound, which has been condensed. From this, the Doctor realises that the Master is trying to conjure up an ancient and all-powerful demon, who is seen on Earth to be the Devil but is an alien. The Doctor explains that the Dæmons have used Earth as a giant experiment throughout its history, becoming part of human myth. The Master has called the Dæmon up once, and right now, it is so small as to be invisible. The third summoning, however, could signal the end of the experiment, and the world.

The Master summons up Azal again and demands to be given the Dæmon's power, but Azal warns him that he is not the Master's servant. Azal says on his third appearance, he will decide if Earth deserves to continue existing. If so, he will give it to the Master. Azal then vanishes in another heat wave.

The Doctor is captured by a mob of villagers working for the Master. They tie him up to a maypole and plan to burn him alive, but with the help of Miss Hawthorne and Benton he escapes. In the Church cavern Jo and Yates watch as the Master summons Azal one last time. They try to interrupt the ritual but are taken prisoner. As Jo is prepared as a sacrifice to Azal, the Brigadier manages to get through the heat barrier and enter the village. The Doctor manages to avoid Bok, who is guarding the Church and gets into the cavern, where the Master is expecting him. Outside, UNIT troops are held back by Bok.

The Doctor and the Master both try to appeal to Azal but for opposite reasons. The huge, devil-like figure decides to give his power to the Master, and fires electricity at the Doctor to kill him. However, Jo, steps in front of the Doctor, asking Azal to kill her instead. Azal is unable to comprehend this illogical act of self-sacrifice, and his power turns against him, destroying himself and the Church. The Master tries to escape but is captured by the UNIT troops and taken away. The Doctor, Jo, Miss Hawthorne and the UNIT team join the villagers in their May Day celebrations.

== Production ==
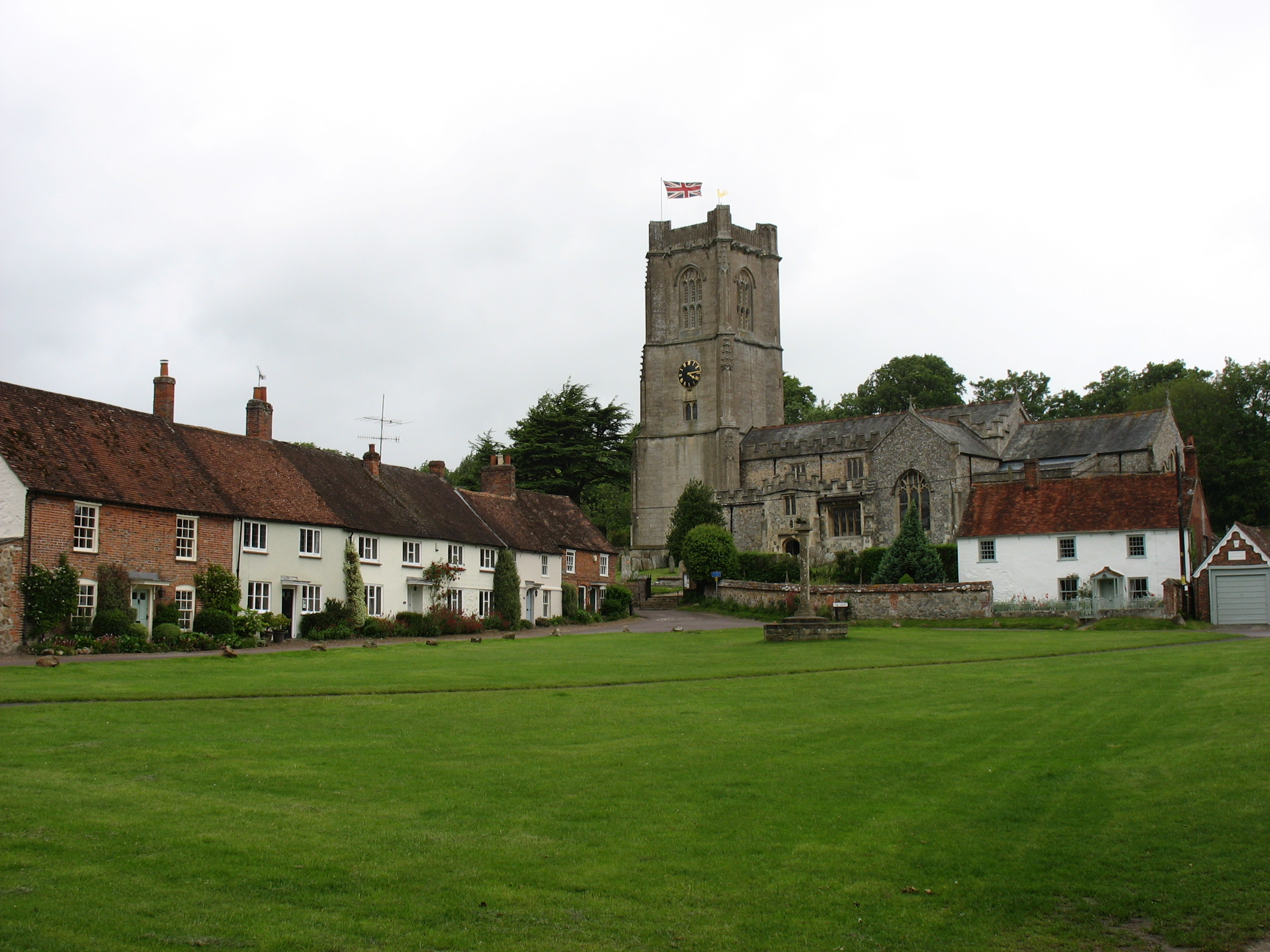
The village of Aldbourne in Wiltshire with St Michael's Church served as the location for Devil's End

The Dæmons began life as an audition scene for the companion Jo Grant. The audition sequence went on to be written into episode four. Producer Barry Letts was keen to write for the show and decided that a story dealing in black magic would be interesting as well as frightening. Script editor Terrance Dicks had reservations however, stating that people may view it as Satanist, and so it was reworked as strictly scientific with occultist themes. The Master was originally intended to worship the demon in a church setting, standing on an altar. However, owing to fears that this might upset religious viewers, the scenes were reset in a crypt. This was subsequently revised again, and the crypt was called a cavern, although the set resembled a church crypt. Letts initially intended to write the story himself but found himself short of time due to his role as a series producer. His wife suggested a friend of hers, Robert Sloman, who was a playwright and journalist. Together they worked on the script in the evening after work. At the time, however, the BBC frowned upon production staff writing for their series and so Letts and Sloman decided on the pseudonym Guy Leopold - Sloman's son and Letts' middle name respectively. The working title for this story was The Demons, which was commissioned on 17 December 1970. The scripts were completed by mid-February 1971 and worked on by Dicks, who had barely completed work on them by the time the story went into pre-production in March.

Director Christopher Barry had worked on Doctor Who before, but wasn't particularly keen to return as he preferred to concentrate on less genre-specific productions. However, he liked the script due to the rural setting and his interest in archaeology. He would go on to direct for the show many times again, but still listed The Dæmons as his favourite, saying it was "a damn good script".

Much of the serial was filmed on location in Aldbourne, Wiltshire. The location shoot was awarded two weeks of filming, more than double the usual amount at the time, leading to a lot of the finished story being set outside, rather than in the studio. Membury Airfield in Berkshire and Bridge Farm, Ramsbury, were also used briefly as locations. Filming began on 19 April 1971 and saw pleasant, sunny weather for the first week, leading to sudden overnight snow in the second week – causing filming to be delayed. Some episode one scenes were filmed at night – a rarity for the show, although some of these scenes were filmed during daylight with a dark filter put over the camera lens. Other dark indoor scenes were filmed in a disused aircraft hangar at Bridge Farm, Ramsbury. Filming for the serial caused great excitement in Aldbourne, with a lot of the village residents appearing as extras, as well as the Headington Quarry Morris dancers performing dances in episodes four and five.

The cast included David Simeon who himself was from Wiltshire where the story was being filmed. He had previously appeared in the Inferno story a year earlier. Comedy actress Damaris Hayman starred throughout the five episodes as Miss Hawthorne in a central role. Hayman herself had an interest in the supernatural and helped out during production as an unofficial adviser. A friend of hers was a practicing witch who had commended the scripts for their accuracy. Veteran British actor Robin Wentworth played Professor Horner. Future television presenter and Sooty puppeteer, Matthew Corbett had a brief role in the final episode as a hooded coven member who objects to the sacrifice of Jo Grant, and was suggested to the production team by friend Katy Manning. Other guest actors in the story include Don McKillop as the pub landlord, John Joyce as Garvin and Stephen Thorne as Azal. Thorne would go on to appear in the show again as costumed villains in The Three Doctors, Frontier in Space and The Hand of Fear.

After three days of studio taping, work on the serial was completed on 16 May 1971, less than a month before transmission of the final episode. This last episode contains footage of a model church being blown up; the scene was realistic enough to lead many viewers to believe that the BBC had blown up a church as part of the filming. The BBC received several letters complaining about this.

The clip of the Brigadier's helicopter blowing up as it crashes into the heat shield is borrowed from the James Bond film From Russia with Love.

The incantation that the Master uses in summoning Azal is actually the nursery rhyme "Mary Had a Little Lamb" said backwards, as well as Damaris Hayman's name said backwards.

== Broadcast ==
| Episode | Title | Run time | Original release date | UK viewers (millions) | Archive |
|---|---|---|---|---|---|
| 1 | "Episode One" | 25:05 | 22 May 1971 | 9.2 | PAL D3 colour restoration |
| 2 | "Episode Two" | 24:20 | 29 May 1971 | 8.0 | PAL D3 colour restoration |
| 3 | "Episode Three" | 24:27 | 5 June 1971 | 8.1 | PAL D3 colour restoration |
| 4 | "Episode Four" | 24:25 | 12 June 1971 | 8.1 | PAL 2" colour videotape |
| 5 | "Episode Five" | 24:04 | 19 June 1971 | 8.3 | PAL D3 colour restoration |

Following the transmission of episode one, the story was discussed by BBC1 controller Paul Fox and Richard Levin, head of television design, who both commended the quality of the script and production. This was a relief to Barry Letts, who due to the extra location filming, had gone over budget on the serial.

The story was repeated on BBC One as a condensed omnibus edition over Christmas 1971 (28 December 1971 at 4.20pm). The Omnibus's opening credits gave the title Doctor Who and the Dæmons (on the Blu-ray release, the Omnibus opening credits' title is just "The Daemons"). The closing credits used were for those of episode 5, necessitating the BBC1 continuity announcer naming the cast from earlier episodes. The omnibus repeat achieved higher ratings than the original broadcast, with 10.5 million viewers.

Of the original 625-line PAL colour videotapes, all except Episode Four were wiped for reuse. However, a converted 525-line colour NTSC version recorded off-air from an American broadcast was made available to the BBC. This version was abridged and unsuitable for transmission as it was not of broadcast standard (the US recordings were made on a domestic Betamax VCR from a KCET repeat in 1978). Doctor Who fan Ian Levine tried to retrieve the original NTSC videotapes from KCET, but had discovered that they had been wiped and reused a few weeks before his visit.

In 1992 the colour signal from the NTSC Betamax tapes was used as the basis for restoring the colour to the 16mm monochrome telerecordings of episodes one, two, three and five. These versions were subsequently repeated on BBC2 on consecutive Fridays in November/December 1992 (20 November 1992 to 18 December 1992 at 7.15pm). The ratings were 2.52, 2.96, 2.30, 2.19 and 2.34 million viewers respectively.

Jon Pertwee stated numerous times over the years that this was his favourite Doctor Who serial. In 1993, Pertwee, along with several members of the cast and crew including Nicholas Courtney, John Levene, Richard Franklin and director Christopher Barry returned to Aldbourne for the Reeltime Pictures reunion documentary Return to Devil's End. Nicholas Courtney titled his 1998 volume of autobiography Five Rounds Rapid after a line from this story: "Jenkins. Chap with the wings there. Five rounds rapid."

== Reception ==
In 2018, The Daily Telegraph ranked The Dæmons at number 11 in "the 56 greatest stories and episodes", describing it as "very much a product of its time" that evoked Hammer Films and also considering it "the quintessential Pertwee story", noting that it was a particular favourite of the cast. The Daily Telegraph concluded that "it may not be one of the greatest stories, but in terms of sheer fun The Dæmons is one of the best". A poll conducted by Doctor Who Magazine in 2009 saw it voted the second best story of the Third Doctor's era. Arnold T. Blumberg of IGN gave The Dæmons a score of 10 out of 10, describing it as "a high point of this Doctor’s time on the show, a classic of the entire series in general, and an amazing document of a particular kind of fantasy horror adventure storytelling so wonderfully '70s and British that it just never loses its charm". Doctor Who Magazine said that the story was "lavishly filmed and well characterised" and gave particular credit to Roger Delgado as the Master. Although the review was less favourable about the climax to the story, it described the closing scene as "perfection".

Reviewing its DVD release, Ian Berriman of SFX was more critical, giving it three and a half out of five stars. He derided it for being an "awful mess" with a plot that "doesn't make a shred of sense". Despite praising the "magnificent" characters of Hawthorne, Horner, and Fergus, he thought that other characters including the Doctor and the Master were "continually acting in a completely absurd way". Paul Cornell, Martin Day and Keith Topping were also unimpressed by the serial, noting its popularity but stating "The Dæmons isn't very good. Its denouement is risible, and even the much praised church explosion effect looks cheap." They did, however, consider the final scene to be "charming". In Doctor Who: The Complete Guide, Mark Campbell awarded it six out of ten, describing it as a "wannabe occult chiller" which "gradually dissipates into a technobabble-filled damp squib". He regarded the "quintessentially English village" as a "pleasant backdrop" but concluded that "much of the action now seems dated". In 2010, SFX named the resolution to the plot as one of the silliest moments in Doctor Who's history.

An April Fool spoof report of a suppressed sixth episode was published in the fanzine DWB in 1993.

== Commercial releases ==
=== In print ===
Doctor Who and the Dæmons
- Author: Barry Letts
- Cover artist: Chris Achilleos
- Series: Doctor Who book: Target novelisations
- Release number: 15
- Publisher: Target Books
- Publication date: 17 October 1974
- ISBN: 0-426-10444-7

A novelisation of this serial, written by Barry Letts, was published by Target Books in October 1974. It was reprinted in 1989 as part of Target's Doctor Who Classics range, printed back to back with Terrance Dicks' novelisation of "The Time Monster", bound in a metallic cover. There have been Dutch and Portuguese language editions. An unabridged reading of the novelisation by author Barry Letts was released on CD in August 2008 by BBC Audiobooks.

The script of this serial, credited to Robert Sloman and Barry Letts edited by John McElroy, and titled The Daemons [sic], was published by Titan Books in October 1992.

=== Home media ===
The final episode of this story was also issued as a black and white film recording on the VHS release The Pertwee Years, along with the final episodes of Inferno and Frontier in Space. In 1993, the episodes with restored colour (see "Broadcast and reception", above) were released on VHS. A DVD of the serial was released on 19 March 2012, featuring improved sound and picture restoration. The DVD included an audio commentary, on-screen text notes, a retrospective documentary "The Devil Rides Out" in which cast & crew looked back on the making of the serial, and an obituary documentary "Remembering Barry Letts" in which family and colleagues looked back over the life and work of the writer/producer/director. The documentary included extensive contributions from Letts himself, from a long interview he conducted with producer Ed Stradling in 2008. The DVD reached No.3 on the TV-related DVD Chart in the UK, remaining in the top 40 for three weeks. In the overall DVD sales chart it peaked at No.30.

This story, along with the rest of Season 8 was released on Blu-ray on 23 February 2021, to coincide with the 50th Anniversary of The Master. It features a brand new restoration of the film and video materials. According to Mark Ayres, who worked on the restoration, the soundtrack for episodes 1-3 & 5 uses the audio from the 16mm tapes, the NTSC Betamax tapes, and two different UK off-air audio recordings from the original 1971 broadcast in different sections of the restored episodes to get the best quality possible.

The Dæmons is one of only several Doctor Who stories from the 1970s to be rated PG by the British Board of Film Classification (BBFC), rather than the broader U. The BBFC found issue with the Master raising a knife in a sacrificial manner, as well as a momentary shot of a police officer's corpse and some "mild scuffling" during fight scenes.
