= Roger Delgado =

British actor (1918–1973)

- Delgado as the Master in The Mind of Evil (1971)
- Born: Roger Caesar Marius Bernard de Delgado Torres Castillo Roberto; 1 March 1918; Whitechapel, London, England
- Died: 18 June 1973 (aged 55); Nevşehir, Turkey
- Resting place: Mortlake Crematorium, London, England
- Occupation: Actor
- Years active: 1939–1973
- Known for: First actor to play The Master in Doctor Who (1971–1973)
- Spouse(s): Olga Anthonisz (divorced) Kismet Shahani (m. 1957)

Roger Caesar Marius Bernard de Delgado Torres Castillo Roberto (1 March 1918 – 18 June 1973) was a British actor. He played many roles on television, radio and in films, and had "a long history of playing minor villains" before becoming best known as the first actor to play the Master in Doctor Who (1971–1973).

== Early life ==
Delgado was born in Whitechapel, in the East End of London, to a French mother and a Spanish father; he often remarked to Doctor Who co-star and close friend Jon Pertwee that this made him a true Cockney, as he was born within the sound of Bow Bells. He did not live in the East End, but was brought up in Bedford Park in west London.

His father was a bank clerk who encouraged Delgado to work the same job; he did try banking for a while but soon left to pursue acting.

He attended Cardinal Vaughan Memorial School, a Roman Catholic secondary school in Holland Park, and the London School of Economics for a brief period, but did not complete his degree. In the late 1930s, he worked in a repertory in Leicester until 1940 when he was called to fight in the Second World War. He served in the war with both the Leicestershire Regiment and the Royal Corps of Signals, attaining the rank of major. After the war ended in 1945, he joined the York repertory company and eventually moved to the BBC drama repertory, where he stayed from 1950 to 1962.

== Career ==
Delgado worked extensively on the British stage, and on television, film and radio. His theatre debut was in 1939 and his first television appearance was 1948. He appeared in the BBC Television serial Quatermass II (1955), the Powell and Pressburger wartime drama Battle of the River Plate (1956), and came to wide popular attention in Britain when he played the duplicitous Spanish envoy Mendoza in the ITC Entertainment series, Sir Francis Drake, from 1961 to 1962, after which he was in much demand. Delgado was frequently cast as a villain, appearing in many British action-adventure TV series by ITC, including Danger Man (1961), The Saint (1962 and 1966), The Champions (1969), and Randall and Hopkirk (Deceased) (1969). His final radio role was in the radio sitcom Parsley Sidings opposite Arthur Lowe.

Delgado made a total of 16 guest appearances in ITC shows, the most of any actor, with his last completed role being ITC's The Zoo Gang (1974). He also appeared in The Avengers (1961 and 1969), The Power Game (1966), and an ITV Play of the Week (The Crossfire, 1967). His films included The Terror of the Tongs, The Road to Hong Kong, The Mummy's Shroud and Antony and Cleopatra.

He began work as The Master on Doctor Who in late 1970, his first broadcast appearance being in the January 1971 adventure Terror of the Autons. He subsequently reprised the role of the Master in the Third Doctor serials The Mind of Evil, The Claws of Axos, Colony in Space, The Dæmons, The Sea Devils, The Time Monster and Frontier in Space. An in-joke in the 1971 Doctor Who story Colony in Space refers to his role as Mendoza in Sir Francis Drake, when the Brigadier tells the Doctor not to worry as the suspected sighting of the Master "was only the Spanish Ambassador". The Master's story arc was to have ended in The Final Game, which was planned as the final story to feature Pertwee's Third Doctor, but the story was scrapped following Delgado's sudden death and replaced with Planet of the Spiders.

== Personal life ==
Delgado's first marriage was to Olga Anthonisz, which ended in divorce. He married Kismet Shahani in 1957 and they remained together until his death in 1973. Kismet died in 2017.

== Death ==
To say that Roger Delgado was merely a friend of mine would be an insult. Roger was one of my greatest friends ever – a modest, lovable man with a ready wit and a fine sense of humour. As Actors, we discovered we shared an uncanny telephatic communication with each other, as he played 'Moriarty' to my 'Holmes'. It was a 'phone call from Kismet, Roger's wife, that gave me the news of his tragic death. I was stunned with disbelief, then, and even now, have to force myself to accept the fact that Roger is no longer with us. As my adversary "The Master" he was evil personnified. As a friend, he was the opposite, warm, feeling and understanding. I shall forever miss him.

— Jon Pertwee talking about Roger Delgado in a September 1985 letter to a fan.

Delgado died on location on 18 June 1973 in Nevşehir, Turkey, whilst shooting La Cloche tibétaine (Tibetan Bell), a French / West German television mini-series about the Yellow Expedition. During this expedition, Citroën tracked vehicles traversed Asia in 1931–32 from Peking and Beirut. Delgado appeared in one episode of this production. He was killed, along with two Turkish film technicians, when the car in which he was travelling went off the road into a ravine. He was 55 years old.

For years, there was mystery surrounding the fate of Delgado's remains. It was revealed in 2017 that his body had been returned to the United Kingdom and cremated at Mortlake before the ashes were scattered on 27 June 1973, in area RB3 (Plot 43) of the Garden of Remembrance at Mortlake Cemetery in Southwest London.

The serial he was filming in Turkey continued production and was completed after his death. The series was broadcast on French and West German television in 1974–1975; Delgado can be seen in episode 4 as the minor character Paco.

Jon Pertwee often remarked that Delgado's death was one of the reasons he decided to leave Doctor Who the following year.

== Filmography ==
=== Film ===
Year	Title	Role	Notes
1952	Murder at Scotland Yard	George Grayson	
1953	The Broken Horseshoe	Felix Galegos	
1953	The Captain's Paradise	Kalikan Policeman	
1953	Blood Orange	Marlowe	
1953	Scotland Yard: The Missing Man	Paris Police Inspector	
1954	The Belles of St. Trinian's	Sultan's Aide	Uncredited
1954	Third Party Risk	Detective Gonzales	
1955	Storm Over the Nile	Native Spy	
1956	The Battle of the River Plate	Captain Varela	
1956	Scotland Yard: Destination Death	Lisbon Police Officer	
1957	Manuela	Stranger	
1957	Man in the Shadow	Alberto	Uncredited
1957	Scotland Yard: The Case of The Smiling Widow	Commissario	
1958	Sea Fury	Salgado	
1958	Mark of the Phoenix	Devron	
1959	First Man into Space	Consul Ramon de Guerrera	
1959	The Stranglers of Bombay	Bundar	Uncredited
1959	Third Man on the Mountain	Italian Climber	Uncredited
1960	Sands of the Desert	Abu Nial	
1961	The Singer Not the Song	Pedro de Cortinez	
1961	The Terror of the Tongs	Tang Hao	
1962	Village of Daughters	Francisco Predati	
1962	The Road to Hong Kong	Jhinnah	
1962	Guns of Darkness	Hernandez (voice)	Dubbed Derek Godfrey
1962	In Search of the Castaways	Patagonian Prisoner	
1963	The Mind Benders	Dr. Jean Bonvoulois	Uncredited
1963	The Running Man	Spanish Doctor	
1964	Hot Enough for June	Josef	
1965	Masquerade	Ahmed Ben Faïd	Uncredited
1966	Khartoum	Sheikh Abdul Rahim	Uncredited
1966	The Sandwich Man	Abdul	
1967	The Mummy's Shroud	Hasmid	
1968	Star!	French Ambassador	Uncredited
1969	The Assassination Bureau	Bureau Member	Uncredited
1969	You Can't Win 'Em All	Capt. Enver (voice)	Dubbed Salih Güney
1970	Underground	Xavier	
1972	Horror Express	Inspector Mirov (voice)	Dubbed Julio Peña
1972	Antony and Cleopatra	Soothsayer	

=== Television ===
Year	Title	Role	Notes
1948	Distinguished Gathering	Eliot Richard Vines	Television film
1954	The Three Musketeers	Athos	6 episodes
1955	St. Ives	Gautier	2 episodes
1955	Quatermass II	Hugh Conrad	Episode: "The Coming"
1956	The Adventures of the Scarlet Pimpernel	Andre	Episode: "The Farmer's Boy"
1957	Assignment Foreign Legion	Lt. Lachaise	Episode: "The Coward"
1957	The Buccaneers	Capt. Mendoza/Don Ferdinand Esteban	3 episodes
1957	Billy Bunter of Greyfriars School	Monsieur Charpentier	Episode: "Bunter the Ventriloquist"
1957	O.S.S.	Luigi	Episode: "Operation Big House"
1957	The Silver Sword	The Nazi	Episode: "Escape from Bavaria"
1957	Sword of Freedom	Virelli	Episode: "Angelica's Past"
1957	White Hunter	Gomez	Episode: "Killer Leopard"
1958	The Adventures of Robin Hood	Ambassador	Episode: "The Minstrel"
1958	Queen's Champion	Don Jose	8 episodes
1959	William Tell	Luigi	Episode: "The Black Brothers"
1959	Hancock's Half Hour	Night Club Manager	Episode: "Spanish Interlude" (uncredited)
1959–1960	The Four Just Men	Inspector Rossi	2 episodes
1959–1965	The Third Man	Luis Mendoza / Henri Banear	4 episodes
1960	The Splendid Spur	Sir Basil Grenville	Episode: "Joan of the Tor"
1960	Biggles	Dr. Ahmed Zakar	3 episodes: "Biggles on the Nile"
1960	The Odd Man	Bernard Berridge	3 episodes
1960–1961	Knight Errant Limited	Branco/Oscar Lederer	2 episodes
1961	One Step Beyond	Capt. Santoro	Episode: "The Face"
1961	Plateau of Fear	General Perera	Episode: "Slam-Down"
1961	Triton	The Man with the Patch	2 episodes
1961	Danger Man	Von Golling	Episode: "Under the Lake"
1961–1962	Sir Francis Drake	Count Bernardino de Mendoza / The Governor	7 episodes
1961–1964	Ghost Squad	Holgar/Major Sayid/Ben Ali/De Souza	4 episodes
1962	Saki	Laposhka	Episode 5
1962	Richard the Lionheart	Laki	Episode: "The Norman King"
1962	Z-Cars	Gregori Katsybalis	Episode: "Business Trip"
1962–1963	Maigret	Pepito/Fouché	2 episodes
1962–1966	The Saint	Hotel Manager/Captain Rodriguez	2 episodes
1963	The Human Jungle	Wirral	Episode: "The Two Edged Sword"
1963	Espionage	Gebal	Episode: "A Camel to Ride"
1964	Crane	Barman	Episode: "Murder Is Waiting"
1964	The Protectors	Slankin	Episode: "Freedom!"
1964	Sergeant Cork	Inspector Puichard	Episode: "The Case of the Great Pearl Robbery"
1965	Sherlock Holmes	Moser	Episode: "The Disappearance of Lady Frances Carfax"
1966	Orlando	King Halara	2 episodes
1966	Court Martial	Salvatore Fratuzzi	Episode: "The Liberators"
1966	The Saint	Captain Rodriguez	Episode: "Locate and Destroy"
1968	Man in a Suitcase	Ambassador	Episode: "Burder of Proof"
1968	Harry Worth	Ambassador	Episode: "James Bond Where Are You?"
1969	The Avengers	Kreer	Episode: "Stay Tuned"
1969	Randall and Hopkirk (Deceased)	Tapiro	Episode: "The Ghost who Saved the Bank at Monte Carlo"
1971	The Rivals of Sherlock Holmes	Silva	Episode: "Madame Sara"
1971–1973	Doctor Who	The Master	37 episodes; serials Terror of the Autons, The Mind of Evil, The Claws of Axos, Colony in Space, The Dæmons, The Sea Devils, The Time Monster and Frontier in Space
1972	The Persuaders!	Estoban	Episode: "To The Death, Baby"
1973	Play of the Month	Officer of the Holy Brotherhood	Episode: "The Adventures of Don Quixote"
1974	The Zoo Gang	Pedro Ortega	Episode: "The Lion Hunt"
1974	La Cloche tibétaine (fr)	Paco	Episode: "L'Escadron d'or"
