= Barry Letts =

English producer (1925–2009)

- Born: Barry Leopold Letts; 26 March 1925; Leicester, Leicestershire, England
- Died: 9 October 2009 (aged 84)
- Occupations: Actor, director, producer, writer
- Years active: 1946–2009
- Spouse: Muriel Letts (m. 1951; died 2009)
- Children: 3

Barry Leopold Letts (26 March 1925 – 9 October 2009) was an English actor, television director, writer and producer, best known for being the producer of Doctor Who from 1969 to 1974.

Born in Leicester, he worked as an actor in theatre, films and television before retiring in his early forties and becoming a television director. He then became the producer of the BBC science fiction series Doctor Who for five years, overseeing almost the entirety of Jon Pertwee's tenure as the Third Doctor and casting Tom Baker as the Fourth Doctor. He produced or directed many of the BBC's Sunday Classic drama serials from 1976 to 1986, and returned to Doctor Who in 1980 to be the executive producer for its eighteenth season.

The Guardian described Letts on his death as "a pioneer of British television" who "served the medium for more than half a century" and "secured his place in TV history" with Doctor Who. He was associated with the series for many years, with active involvement in the television programme from 1967 to 1981 (as a director, producer, executive producer and writer) and with later contributions to its spin-offs in other media.

== Early career ==
Letts was an assistant stage manager at Leicester's Theatre Royal in his teens and took up the job full-time after leaving Wyggeston Grammar School for Boys. His initial work was as a repertory actor, following his service as a Sub-Lieutenant in the Royal Navy during the Second World War. He later played one of the leading characters in the Terence Fisher directed film, To the Public Danger, a heartfelt plea against dangerous driving. He also appeared in the highly regarded Ealing Studios productions, Scott of the Antarctic and The Cruel Sea, in supporting roles.

From 1950 he appeared in various live television productions including Gunpowder Guy (broadcast on 5 November 1950) in which future Doctor Who actor Patrick Troughton played Guy Fawkes and Letts a fellow conspirator. He also appeared as Colonel Herncastle in the 1959 television adaptation of Wilkie Collins's novel The Moonstone, and played roles in The Last Man Out and The Avengers.

Much of his television work was for the BBC. Letts gave up his acting career after completing the BBC's director's course. His early directorial work included episodes of the long-running police drama Z-Cars and a soap opera, The Newcomers.

== Doctor Who ==
Letts' first involvement with Doctor Who was in 1967 when he directed the Patrick Troughton serial The Enemy of the World. This was a complex serial to direct as Troughton played both the Doctor and the dictator "Salamander" in the same story and sometimes in the same scenes – a rare and demanding directorial requirement for the 1960s. However, in his memoir Who and Me, Letts related how he naively used matte boxes to allow Troughton to act face to face with himself, when in fact optical printing was already available and the same could have been accomplished in post-production.

He became the series' producer in October 1969, replacing Derrick Sherwin, with Jon Pertwee recently cast as the Doctor. Letts' first story as producer was Pertwee's second, Doctor Who and the Silurians, and he remained the producer for the rest of the Pertwee serials, becoming the father figure in the 'family' atmosphere that had developed on the show at that time. It was an era of substantial change for Doctor Who, with episodes broadcast in colour for the first time and an improved budget which enabled more location filming and action sequences than had previously been possible. Letts also embraced the technological innovations which came with moving the series into colour, most notably his enthusiasm for Colour Separation Overlay. He also oversaw the celebration of the programme's tenth anniversary in 1973, uniting the first three Doctors in the first multiple Doctor story, The Three Doctors.

When he took over, a recent BBC decision had cut the season length from over 40 episodes a year to 26. Notable changes Letts made, as related in his autobiography Who and Me, included producing the show in two-episode blocks, rather than as separate episodes: rehearsing two episodes for a fortnight, and then recording those two episodes back-to-back, thereby reducing the demands on the studio scenic crews, who only had to erect and strike the sets once a fortnight instead of once a week. This was a profoundly significant change: it allowed much more rehearsal time, in a much less frantic atmosphere; it ended a long running dispute with the unions representing the technical crews; it reduced wear-and-tear on the sets (and the budget allocations for repairing the damage); and it meant that, forever after, serials could only be made in multiples of 2 episodes—a primary reason for the 4-episode and 6-episode format dominating the schedules for the following fifteen years. He also retired the original howl-around title sequence used, with variations, from 1963 until 1973, introducing as its replacement the classic time tunnel special effects sequence which would run, until 1980, behind the opening and closing credits for every episode produced in seasons 11 to 17.

When he was offered the chance to become producer on the series, Letts made it a condition that he be allowed to also continue to direct. The Head of Serials agreed to this, and Letts directed three Doctor Who serials during his time as producer: Terror of the Autons, Carnival of Monsters and Planet of the Spiders. Letts also directed most of the studio scenes for Inferno after Douglas Camfield was taken ill during the production. Letts's final work as a director on the series was when he returned in 1975 to direct The Android Invasion during the era of Philip Hinchcliffe as producer.

Letts formed a particularly close partnership with two other contributors to the programme: Terrance Dicks, who was the script editor on the programme between 1968 and 1974; and playwright Robert Sloman, with whom Letts co-wrote four serials in the Pertwee era: The Dæmons (credited under the pen-name Guy Leopold); The Time Monster; The Green Death; and Planet of the Spiders, which was Pertwee's swansong. Letts later provided an official obituary for Sloman in December 2005, published in The Guardian. Letts was a Buddhist and also held liberal political views. According to Toby Hadoke, who contributed to his Guardian obituary, "Letts's liberal worldview led him to commission stories with contemporary resonance – eco-parables, critiques on colonialism and apartheid, even entry into the Common Market (the Galactic Federation in Doctor Who parlance) were all presented within a format of child-friendly derring-do."

One of Letts' final tasks as producer was to cast Tom Baker as the Fourth Doctor. Baker was recommended to him by Bill Slater, an experienced former director who was then serving as the Head of Serials at the BBC. After one story with Baker, Robot, Letts left the position of producer in 1974, having been the longest serving producer on the programme until that time.

In 1980, he returned to Doctor Who to be executive producer during John Nathan-Turner's first season as producer, between The Leisure Hive and Tom Baker's final story, Logopolis. Letts' return to the programme was because Nathan-Turner had not previously been either a director or producer, and a restructuring of the BBC Drama Department meant that Head of Series and Serials Graeme MacDonald was unable to offer the support previous producers had received. As it happened, Nathan-Turner stayed for nine years, overtaking Letts as the longest serving producer on Doctor Who. When the programme returned in 2005, Letts was involved in the hectic round of interviews to promote the show, appearing for a lengthy discussion piece on The Daily Politics with Andrew Neil on BBC2.

Letts also wrote the scripts for two radio plays based on the show, starring Jon Pertwee with Nicholas Courtney as the Brigadier and Elisabeth Sladen as Sarah Jane, broadcast in the 1990s: The Paradise of Death and The Ghosts of N-Space. He wrote the novelisations of the TV story The Dæmons (Target Books, 1974) and of both of his radio plays The Paradise of Death (Target, 1994) and The Ghosts of N-Space (Virgin Books, 1995, published as part of the Virgin Missing Adventures line). He also wrote two original Doctor Who novels published by BBC Books: Deadly Reunion (co-written with Terrance Dicks, 2003) and Island of Death (2005). He, like Terrance Dicks, also wrote radio dramas for the Big Finish company's series of productions starring Elisabeth Sladen as Sarah Jane Smith, released on CD. In 2008, he performed an unabridged audiobook reading of his novelisation of The Dæmons.

In June 2008 he recorded a long in-vision interview covering his entire career, and his Doctor Who years in particular, excerpts of which continued to be widely used on future DVD releases, most notably on an obituary documentary "Remembering Barry Letts" which was included on the BBC DVD release of The Dæmons. He continued to record commentaries and interviews for DVD releases of his Doctor Who episodes until shortly before his death in 2009.

His involvement with Doctor Who was far wider than simply his professional work of writing, directing and producing the show. He frequently gave interviews, attended conventions, and made personal appearances in connection with the show and his work on it and indeed other aspects of his career. He enjoyed a lifelong friendship with Terrance Dicks, established in 1969, and they frequently attended events as a team.

Letts' work on the show is inextricably linked with the character of the Third Doctor, as played by Jon Pertwee. With the exceptions of The Enemy of the World, Robot, The Android Invasion and his one season as executive producer in 1980–81, every Doctor Who story regardless of media in which Letts has been involved – whether as producer, director or writer – involved this version of the character.

== Later work ==
His other work included producing and co-creating the TV series Moonbase 3 with Terrance Dicks in 1973.

After leaving Doctor Who he remained with the BBC, doing a mixture of directing and producing. He directed for numerous series and serials (including on Doctor Who in 1975), before settling into the role of producer of the BBC's Sunday classic serials (where he appointed his friend and former Doctor Who collaborator, Terrance Dicks, as his script editor). He oversaw more than 25 serials in this capacity, over an 8-year period, including Nicholas Nickleby, Great Expectations, A Tale of Two Cities, Dombey and Son, The Hound of the Baskervilles (starring Tom Baker), The Invisible Man, Pinocchio, Gulliver in Lilliput, Alice in Wonderland, Lorna Doone, Little Lord Fauntleroy, The Children of the New Forest, Beau Geste and Sense and Sensibility. Many actors with whom he had worked on Doctor Who were to feature in these classic serials, including Tom Baker, Elisabeth Sladen, Caroline John, and Paul Darrow.

His final directing work was on the BBC soap opera EastEnders which he worked on periodically from 1990 to 1992. He also taught directing for the BBC at Elstree Studios.

He had a small cameo role in the film Exodus, broadcast on UK Channel 4.

His autobiography, Who and Me, was published posthumously in November 2009, then released as a talking book on CD, read by Letts himself, and later broadcast on BBC Radio 7.

== Death ==
Having suffered from cancer for many years before his death, Letts died on 9 October 2009 at the age of 84. His wife, Muriel, had also died earlier that year. Letts was survived by his three children: Dominic, Crispin and Joanna. Dominic and Crispin had followed him into the acting profession.

Following Letts' death, Tom Baker was interviewed for BBC Radio 4's Last Word to pay tribute. He described Letts as "the big link in changing my entire life". Doctor Who executive producer Russell T Davies also wrote a personal tribute to him in issue No.415 of Doctor Who Magazine.

The November 2009 Doctor Who episode "The Waters of Mars" was dedicated to his memory. Issue No.417 of Doctor Who Magazine included a 12-page tribute to Letts and featured contributions from former colleagues including Frazer Hines, Mary Peach, Terrance Dicks, Nicholas Courtney, Graeme Harper, Katy Manning, Christopher Barry, Elisabeth Sladen and Baker.

It had been intended for Letts to attend the Doctor Who Appreciation Society's convention 'Time and Again' at Riverside Studios in Hammersmith that year, until it became clear his health would not allow this. He died shortly before the convention and as a small tribute the end credits of the recently recoloured Planet of the Daleks Part Three, shown at the event, were changed to end with an 'In Memory of Barry Letts 1925–2009' caption.

== Filmography ==
Year	Title	Role	Notes
1947	San Demetrio London	Apprentice John Jones	
1947	Frieda	Jim Merrick	
1948	To the Public Danger	Fred Lane	Short
1948	Scott of the Antarctic	Apsley Cherry-Garrard	
1949	A Boy, a Girl and a Bike	Syd	
1953	The Cruel Sea	Raikes	
1956	Reach for the Sky	Tommy	Uncredited
2007	Exodus	Professor Marcus	(final film role)

Preceded by Derrick Sherwin	Doctor Who Producer; 1970–75	Succeeded by Philip Hinchcliffe
