= Richard Franklin (actor) =

English actor (1936–2023)

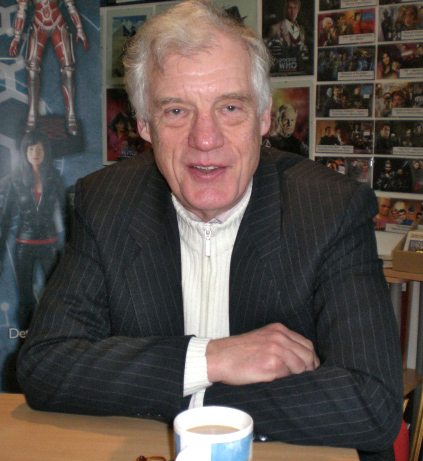
- Franklin in 2009
- Born: Richard Kimber Franklin; 15 January 1936; Marylebone, London, England
- Died: 25 December 2023 (aged 87); Islington, London, England
- Occupations: Actor; writer; director; political activist
- Years active: 1966–2021
- Known for: Captain Mike Yates in Doctor Who
- Political party: Liberal Democrats (before 1996); Referendum Party (1996–1997); UKIP (1997–2005); Silent Majority (2005–2015); 30-50 coalition (2015–2023)

Richard Kimber Franklin (15 January 1936 – 25 December 2023) was an English actor, writer, director and political activist. Principally a stage actor, he also appeared as a regular character in several high-profile British television programmes, including Crossroads and Emmerdale Farm, and he portrayed Captain Mike Yates of UNIT in Doctor Who from 1971 until 1974, returning to the role on a number of occasions both on television and in Doctor Who spin-off media.

Franklin was a dramatist and the author of the book Forest Wisdom: Radical Reform of Democracy and the Welfare State, which reflected his political views and activism. He also wrote novels based in the Whoniverse. Franklin stood as a candidate for the UK Parliament for several parties and founded the Silent Majority Party.

== Early life and career ==
Richard Kimber Franklin was born in Marylebone, London, on 15 January 1936, son of Richard Harrington Franklin (1906–1991) CBE, a surgeon at the Royal Postgraduate Medical School, Hammersmith, specialising in the oesophagus, and who was chosen to give the 1977 Hunterian Oration at the Royal College of Surgeons, and Helen Margaret (1907–1987), daughter of Sir Henry Dixon Kimber, 2nd Baronet.

Franklin was educated at Westminster School, and read PPE before going on to complete an MA in Modern History at Christ Church, Oxford. During National Service he was commissioned into the Royal Green Jackets (Rifle Brigade) and was a captain in Queen Victoria's Rifles. Prior to embarking on an acting career, he spent three years at the advertising agency Hobson and Grey as an assistant account executive, assistant producer and scriptwriter.

Franklin trained as an actor at the Royal Academy of Dramatic Art (RADA), where he won the Jenny Laird prize.

== Theatre ==
Immediately after graduating from RADA, Franklin spent six years in repertory theatre, beginning at the Century Theatre under the directorship of Heinz Bernard. He then spent two years at Birmingham Rep under Peter Dews, a season at Bristol Old Vic under Val May, before moving to Ipswich where in addition to acting he also held an associate directorship.

Franklin appeared in a number of productions in London's West End. In 1967 he played the role of Corin in As You Like It at the Vaudeville Theatre, alongside Brian Cox as Orlando. In 1978 he took over the lead role in Same Time, Next Year from Michael Crawford. His latest activity was understudying the part of Arthur Kipps in The Woman in Black at the Fortune Theatre, playing the role on a number of occasions. Other theatre acting work included Macbeth (RSC), The Rocky Horror Show (as the Narrator), The Spider's Web (UK Tour for Ian Dickens), Romeo and Juliet (UK Tour with Sean Maguire), The Importance of Being Earnest (English Speaking Theatre, Frankfurt).

A prolific dramatist, a number of Franklin's plays have been produced professionally. These include:

- The Trial of Johnny Bull (Ipswich Theatre)
- Dr Weird and the Amazing Box (Renaissance Theatre)
- The Cage (Edinburgh) Winner, Spirit of the Fringe award
- Shakespeare was a Hunchback (Edinburgh). The play was later used as the basis for the ITV production The Trial of Richard III
- Poison (London Charterhouse)
- Luck of the Draw (premiered at London Charterhouse in 2014, prior to a small-scale National Tour.)
- Shakespeare by Shaggers (Brighton Fringe)

Franklin had a long association with the British pantomime tradition, having appeared in eighteen different productions. His last pantomime role was the Emperor of China in Aladdin at the New Victoria Theatre, during First Family Entertainment's 2014–15 season. Franklin continued to produce new work, the last of which is The Luck of the Draw, a drama based on his uncle's private diaries and the experiences of a Tommy in the First World War.

As a director, Franklin held an associate directorship at Ipswich. He directed seasons at Swansea Grand and Chesterfield Civic, and was artistic director of Renaissance Theatre in Ulverston in Cumbria. He directed at the Webber Douglas Academy of Dramatic Art and Mountview Academy of Theatre Arts, as well as a number of London, Edinburgh and Brighton Fringe productions.

== Television ==
Franklin first came to television prominence in 1969 as Joe Townsend in Crossroads, appearing in thirty-six episodes. Over the course of a long television career he appeared in a number of well-known British programmes including Blake's 7, Dixon of Dock Green, The Saint, Heartbeat, and Emmerdale Farm.

=== Doctor Who ===
Franklin first appeared in Doctor Who in the role of Mike Yates, a captain in the fictional military organisation UNIT, in the serial Terror of the Autons (1971), which was the opening story of Jon Pertwee's second season in the role of the Third Doctor. He continued as a series regular until the serial Planet of the Spiders (1974), which also marked the end of Pertwee's time as the Doctor.

Franklin maintained his association with Doctor Who and appeared regularly at conventions, and in spin-off and documentary productions. He recreated Captain Mike Yates on television twice, for the twentieth anniversary special "The Five Doctors" (1983) and the thirtieth anniversary 3D Special for Children in Need: Dimensions in Time (1993). A photograph of Franklin in his role as Yates appeared on screen in the fiftieth anniversary special "The Day of the Doctor" (2013). He also appeared in the role on numerous occasions in audio plays for both Big Finish Productions and the BBC, which included appearing alongside the Fourth Doctor, Tom Baker.

In 2002 Franklin wrote The Killing Stone, a novel featuring Yates as the main character. It was initially released as an audio book, read by the author, before publication by Fantom Films in 2013 under the title Operation H.A.T.E. The rewritten version of the book removed all named references to Doctor Who characters and replaced them with unambiguous equivalents in order to avoid infringing copyright. Franklin also recorded a short cameo, as himself for the live Doctor Who podcast stage show, 50 Years of Doctor Who: Preachrs Podcast Live 2. He appeared in this alongside a mix of Doctor Who actors from the original and revived series, including Nicholas Briggs, Peter Davison, Simon Fisher Becker and Terry Molloy.

== Film ==
Franklin collaborated with the director Julian Doyle on two films: Chemical Wedding (2008), about the occultist Aleister Crowley, and Twilight of the Gods (2013), in which he portrayed the German composer Richard Wagner. In 2016, he played Sirro Argonne, one of the Death Star engineers in the Star Wars film Rogue One.

== Audio drama ==
In addition to his numerous appearances in Doctor Who audio dramas, including the audiobook Last of the Gaderene by Mark Gatiss, Franklin's audio credits include two years at BBC radio drama; Sapphire and Steel: The Surest Poison (Big Finish); Harrison Howell in the BBC Radio 2 production of Kiss Me Kate (1996); USA Family Radio; and his own World War I docudrama Luck of the Draw. He also played Davros' father, Nasgard, in the Big Finish audio drama miniseries I, Davros.

== Music videos ==
In 2009 Franklin starred in "The First Days of Spring" for the band Noah and the Whale.

== Journalism ==
Franklin worked as a theatre critic, and published a number of reviews for the Edinburgh Evening News and fringereview.co.uk.

== Political activities ==
Franklin's political activities included:

- Candidate in the 1992 United Kingdom general election in Sheffield Brightside for the Liberal Democrats, receiving 5,273 votes
- Candidate in the 1997 United Kingdom general election in Hackney South and Shoreditch for the Referendum Party, receiving 613 votes
- Candidate in the 2001 United Kingdom general election in Hove for the United Kingdom Independence Party, receiving 358 votes
- Founded the Silent Majority Party
- Candidate in the 2005 United Kingdom general election in Hove for the Silent Majority Party, receiving 78 votes
- Founded the 30-50 coalition. The group fielded Elliot Ball as a candidate in the 2015 United Kingdom general election in Bethnal Green and Bow. Ball received 78 votes.

Franklin's political work led to television appearances on Campaign Calendar (Yorkshire TV). In 1993 he made a speech to the Liberal Democrat Conference which was broadcast by Sky TV.

== Personal life and death ==
In later life Franklin converted from Protestantism to Roman Catholicism.

Franklin died following a long illness on 25 December 2023, aged 87.

== Filmography ==
=== Film ===
Year	Title	Role	Notes
1968	The Fiction Makers	Guard	
2004	Feedback	Mr. Montague	
2008	Chemical Wedding	Dean of Trinity University	
2009	The First Days of Spring	Older Ethan	
2013	Twilight of the Gods	Richard Wagner	
2016	Rogue One	Engineer	

=== Television ===
Year	Title	Role	Notes
1966	Dixon of Dock Green	PBX Operator	Episode: "Fire, Sleet and Candlelight"
1968	The Saint	Guard	Episode: "The Fiction Makers"
1969	Crossroads	Joe Townsend	36 episodes
1970	The Doctors	Young Doctor	Episode: #1.24
1970	From a Bird's Eye View	Constable	Episode: "Family Tree"
1970	Little Women	Jack Scott	Episode: #1.5
1971–1974, 1983	Doctor Who	Captain Mike Yates	42 episodes
1973	The Pathfinders	Flying Officer Bundy	Episode: "Operation Pickpocket"
1980	Blake's 7	Federation Trooper	Episode: "Aftermath"
1981	The Borgias	Party Guest	Episode: "Part 1"
1984	Waving to a Train	Young Richard	TV movie
1988–1989	Emmerdale	Denis Rigg	35 episodes
1993	Doctor Who: Dimensions in Time	Captain Yates	Mini episode: "Part 2"
1993	Harry	Solicitor	Episode: #1.11
1995	The Gambling Man	Gambler	Episode: #1.1
1997	Heartbeat	Doctor	Episode: "Fool for Love"
