= Nicholas Courtney =

British actor (1929–2011)

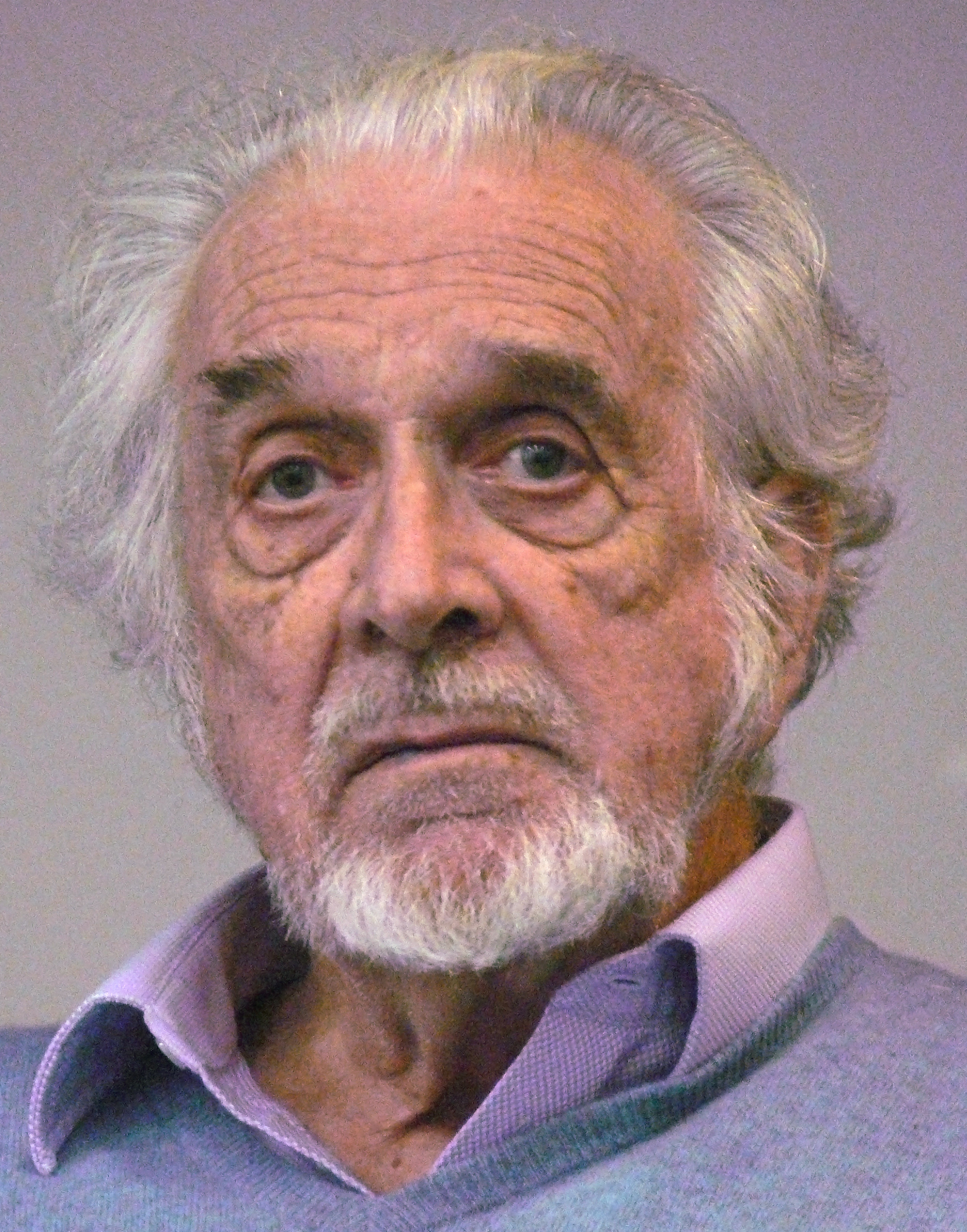
- Courtney in 2010
- Born: William Nicholas Stone Courtney; 16 December 1929; Cairo, Egypt
- Died: 22 February 2011 (aged 81); London, England
- Occupation: Actor
- Years active: 1957–2008
- Known for: Doctor Who
- Spouses: Madeleine Seignol (m. 1962; div. 1978); Karen Harding (m. 1994)
- Children: 2

William Nicholas Stone Courtney (16 December 1929 – 22 February 2011) was an Egyptian-born British actor. He was best known for his long-running role as Brigadier Lethbridge-Stewart in the BBC science fiction television series Doctor Who.

== Early life ==
Nicholas Courtney was born 16 December 1929 in Cairo, Egypt, the son of Major Geoffrey William Courtney, a British army officer and diplomat, and Evelyn (née Stout). His paternal grandparents were the Oxford academic and journalist William Leonard Courtney and his first wife, Cordelia (née Place). His grandfather, W. L. Courtney, had been an amateur actor during his tenure at Oxford University and was involved in the early productions in the New Theatre by the Oxford University Dramatic Society. Nicholas' parents separated in 1931, when his mother left the household. He was raised by his father and stepmother, Anne (née Perrott), after the couple married in 1938.

Courtney was educated in France, Kenya and Egypt and attended a public school in Kent. On his maternal side he was descended from New Zealand politician John Cuff. He did his national service in the British Army, leaving after 18 months as a private, not wanting to pursue a military career. He moved to England to join London's Webber Douglas Academy of Dramatic Art. After two years of repertory theatre in Northampton, he became resident in London in 1961.

Courtney's first television work was in the 1957 series Escape. He made guest appearances in several cult television series, including The Avengers (1962, 1967), The Man in Room 17 (1965), The Champions (1968), Randall and Hopkirk (1969) and as a racing driver in Riviera Police (1965), and briefly appeared as a TV panel chairman in the film Take a Girl Like You (1970), hosting a debate between John Bird and John Fortune.

== Doctor Who ==
During William Hartnell's tenure as the First Doctor, director Douglas Camfield originally considered Courtney for the role of Richard the Lionheart in the serial The Crusade (1965), a role that ultimately went to Julian Glover. Camfield kept Courtney in mind for future roles, and later that year cast him in The Daleks' Master Plan, in which he played Space Security Agent Bret Vyon.

Camfield liked Courtney's performance, and when the director was assigned the 1968 serial The Web of Fear, he initially cast Courtney as Captain Knight. When David Langton gave up the role of Colonel Lethbridge-Stewart to work elsewhere, Camfield recast Captain Knight and gave the part to Courtney instead. The Lethbridge-Stewart character returned in the next season in The Invasion, promoted to the rank of brigadier, and in charge of the British contingent of UNIT. The organisation had been charged with protecting Earth from alien invasion. Years later, actor and writer Ian Marter (who played UNIT medical officer Harry Sullivan alongside Tom Baker) named a Russian military base used in The Invasion, but unnamed on screen, "Nykortny" in his novelisation of the story.

In this recurring role, he appeared semi-regularly in 101 episodes between 1970 and 1975. The character proved popular enough to return in 1983, first in Mawdryn Undead and in the official 20th anniversary special "The Five Doctors". Courtney made his final appearance in the 1989 serial Battlefield (although like many other former cast members, he reprised the role for the charity special Dimensions in Time). He appeared with Jean Marsh in both his first and last regular Doctor Who television appearances. Jean Marsh portrayed the character of Sara Kingdom in Courtney's first appearance, The Daleks' Master Plan, playing his character's sister. In Courtney's final appearance on the show, Marsh portrayed the villainous Morgaine in the Arthurian-inspired Battlefield. Marsh also appeared in the earlier story The Crusade for which Courtney had been considered. Courtney played Lethbridge-Stewart, either on television or in spin-off audio plays, alongside every subsequent Doctor up to and including Paul McGann, as well as substitute First Doctor Richard Hurndall. He did not act in the revived series, but appeared in archive footage. While he acted with Tenth Doctor actor David Tennant in the Big Finish audio dramas Sympathy for the Devil and UNIT: The Wasting, Tennant was playing a different character, Colonel Ross Brimmicombe-Wood, on both occasions.

Fifteen years after Dimensions in Time, Courtney returned as Lethbridge-Stewart (now, Sir Alistair), freshly returned from Peru, in Enemy of the Bane (2008), a two-part story in the Doctor Who spin-off The Sarah Jane Adventures, starring Elisabeth Sladen as Sarah Jane Smith. The Sarah Jane Adventures production team intended that Courtney would reappear in the following year's The Wedding of Sarah Jane Smith so that Lethbridge-Stewart would meet the Tenth Doctor, but Courtney was recovering from a stroke and unable to take part.

Following Courtney's death on 22 February 2011, Lethbridge-Stewart was written out as having also died; when the Eleventh Doctor wanted to contact him in "The Wedding of River Song", he was informed that Sir Alistair has died some months earlier at his nursing home. The Brigadier was mentioned several times in the series' golden anniversary episode, "The Day of the Doctor", (Note: "Kate Lethbridge-Stewart ... as I'm sure your father would have told you..." "I need you to send me one of my father's incident files..." "Somewhere in your memory, there is a man called Brigadier Alistair Gordon Lethbridge-Stewart; I'm his daughter." "'Science leads,' Kate. Is that what you meant? Is that what your father meant?" "Space-time telegraph, Kate; a gift from me to your father.") and quoted once; (Note: "Three of them?! All my worst nightmares at once!" from The Three Doctors is repeated by the general defending Gallifrey.) and, with a prominent close-up of his archival portrait, Courtney is the only individual to appear in all the Doctor Who anniversary stories prior to "The Day of the Doctor". (Note: He was a regular co-star as the Brigadier in the tenth anniversary serial, The Three Doctors, guest-starred as the retired brigadier in the 20th anniversary episode, "The Five Doctors", made a cameo appearance (never clarified if he was Lethbridge-Stewart or another character) chatting with other sightseers in the queue to visit Windsor Castle in the silver anniversary serial, Silver Nemesis, and had his only scene with the Sixth Doctor in the non-canonical 30th anniversary special, Dimensions in Time.)

In a 2008 interview, Courtney criticised the pacing of the new series of Doctor Who, saying: "It’s all a bit rushed sometimes. It’s a heck of a lot to get in in three quarters of an hour, the whole story. In the old days, it used to be half an hour every Saturday for four Saturdays, or six Saturdays, so it does all seem to be a bit of a rush. In fact, it leaves me rather gasping for breath sometimes." Courtney also commented: "I think people’s attention span is more limited than it used to be."

== After Doctor Who ==
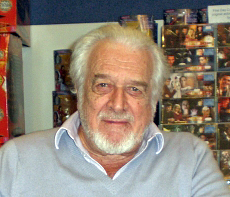
Courtney at The Television & Movie Store, Norwich, England, on 19 January 2008

Courtney continued to act extensively in theatre and television after his main Doctor Who appearances, guest-starring in television programmes including Whodunnit? in 1977, where he appeared again with Jon Pertwee, Minder (1984), All Creatures Great and Small (1980, episode "Matters of Life And Death"), Only Fools and Horses (1988) and Yes, Prime Minister (1986), and the 1984 television movie To Catch a King. In 1982 he was cast alongside Frankie Howerd in the World War II-set comedy series Then Churchill Said to Me but the series remained untransmitted for over a decade due to the outbreak of the Falklands War. He also had a regular role in the comedy French Fields between 1989 and 1991.

Courtney also appeared in an episode of the long-running BBC TV series The Two Ronnies alongside Ronnie Barker and Ronnie Corbett as the character of 'Captain Dickie Chapman', a fellow prisoner-of-war (POW) in Colditz during World War II, in a sketch based on the original BBC serial, Colditz.

In 1985, Courtney played 'The Narrator' in The Rocky Horror Show. In 1989 he portrayed Temple in the BBC Radio 4 adaption of John Wyndham's Survival. He also appeared briefly in the 1990 film Bullseye!, directed by Michael Winner.

Courtney also appeared in the Big Finish Productions audio drama Earthsearch Mindwarp, based on a James Follett novel, broadcast on the digital radio station BBC 7. Courtney starred as Inspector Lionheart opposite fellow Doctor Who actor Terry Molloy in the audio series The Scarifyers, from Cosmic Hobo Productions. The first two Scarifyers adventures, The Nazad Conspiracy and The Devil of Denge Marsh, were broadcast on BBC 7 in 2007; the third, entitled For King and Country in 2008, and fourth, The Curse of the Black Comet, in 2010. He also appeared in three episodes of Kaldor City as the newscaster Danl Packard. He regularly made personal appearances at science fiction conventions and in 1997 was made the honorary president of the Doctor Who Appreciation Society. Courtney also appeared in BBC Radio 4's five part chilling radio drama "Outbreak of Fear" by R.D. Wingfield in the 1980s (repeated on BBC Radio 4 Extra up to August 2017 in stereo only on TV and online - not DAB).

In 1998, Courtney released his autobiography, titled Five Rounds Rapid! (ISBN 978-1852277826) after a line of dialogue the Brigadier had in the 1971 Doctor Who serial The Dæmons. He recorded his memoirs, subtitled A Soldier in Time for release on CD in 2002 by Big Finish.

In 2008 he appeared in his final film role in Incendiary, as the Archbishop of Canterbury, alongside Ewan McGregor. 2008 also saw his final TV role, reprising Brigadier Lethbridge-Stewart, and reuniting with Elizabeth Sladen as Sarah Jane Smith, in the Doctor Who spin-off series The Sarah Jane Adventures, in the Series Two finale, Enemy of the Bane.

Courtney's updated autobiography, Still Getting Away With It (ISBN 978-1871330731), was published in 2005, with co-author Michael McManus.

== Death ==
Courtney's death was reported by SFX and The Stage early in the morning of 23 February 2011. Doctor Who audio play producers Big Finish, with whom Courtney had worked on several releases in his continuing role as the Brigadier, confirmed the date of his death as 22 February 2011. The BBC reported that he had "died in London at the age of 81".

According to Courtney's official website, he died following a brief illness. Doctor Who writer Mark Gatiss called him "a childhood hero and the sweetest of gentlemen". Former Doctor Who co-star Tom Baker also paid tribute, having visited him on the Friday before his death. Baker wrote "We shall miss him terribly" in a newsletter on his website, in which he also indicated that Courtney had been battling cancer for a few months prior to his death.

== Filmography ==
=== Film ===
Year	Title	Role	Notes
1966	The Brides of Fu Manchu	Sergeant	Film debut, Uncredited
1969	Doppelgänger	Medical Data Analyst	Uncredited
1970	Take a Girl Like You	Panel Chairman	
1971	Endless Night	Second Auctioneer	Uncredited
1974	Soft Beds, Hard Battles	French Intelligence Officer	Uncredited
1990	Bullseye!	Sir Hugh	
1995	Downtime	Brigadier Lethbridge-Stewart	Direct-to-video Doctor Who spin-off
2008	Incendiary	Archbishop of Canterbury	Final film

=== Television ===
Year	Title	Role	Notes
1962, 1967	The Avengers	Captain Gifford/Captain Legros	2 episodes
1965	The Saint	Alain/Policeman	2 episodes
1965	Doctor Who	Bret Vyon	Serial: The Daleks' Master Plan
1968, 1970–1975, 1983, 1988, 1989	Doctor Who	Colonel/Brigadier Alistair Gordon Lethbridge-Stewart	107 episodes
1968, 1970–1975, 1983, 1988, 1989	Doctor Who	Man chatting with other sightseers in the queue to visit Windsor Castle (Note: It was never clarified if he was Brigadier Lethbridge-Stewart or another character.)	Uncredited cameo; serial Silver Nemesis
1966	Watch the Birdies	Bill Page	5 episodes
1968	The Champions	Doctor Farley	1 episode
1969	Randall and Hopkirk (Deceased)	Max	Episode: "The Ghost who Saved the Bank at Monte Carlo"
1973	The Rivals of Sherlock Holmes	Hutchinson Hatch	Episode: "Cell 13"
1973	The Two Ronnies	Dickie	1 episode
1977	Whodunnit?	Peter Hampshire	Episode: "The Last Tango in Tooting"
1980	All Creatures Great and Small	Paul Cotterell	Episode: "Matters of Life and Death"
1984	To Catch a King	de Oliveira	TV movie
1984	Minder	Raymond Wilkins	Episode: "The Balance of Power"
1987	Yes Prime Minister	Police Commissioner	Episode: "A Diplomatic Incident"
1988	Only Fools and Horses	Charles	Episode: "Dates"
1989–1991	French Fields	Marquis	5 episodes
1991, 2007	The Bill	Dr Nigel Botterill/Judge	2 episodes
1992	Screen One	Tim Aying	Episode: "Born Kicking"
1993	Then Churchill Said to Me	Lt. Col. Robin Witherton	6 episodes, filmed in 1982
1993	Children in Need	Brigadier Alistair Gordon Lethbridge-Stewart	Special: Dimensions in Time
1996	Satellite City	English Stan	Episode: "The Other Side"
2005	Doctors	Edmund Black	Episode: "Heart on His Sleeve"
2007	Casualty	Claude Devigny	Episode: "The Fires Within"
2008	The Sarah Jane Adventures	Brigadier Alistair Gordon Lethbridge-Stewart	Serial: "Enemy of the Bane"
