= List of islands of Eritrea =

Islands of Eritrea

This is a list of islands of Eritrea.

== Dahlak Archipelago ==
- Dahlak Kebir (formerly Dehalak Deset)
- Dhuladhiya
- Dissei (formerly Valentia Island)
- Dohul
- Erwa
- Harat
- Harmil
- Howakil
- Isra-Tu
- Nahaleg
- Nora
- Shumma

== Other islands in the Red Sea ==
- Fatma Island
- Halib
- Hando
- Hanish Islands
- Howakil Islands
- Massawa Island

== See also ==
- Geography of Eritrea
- List of islands in the Red Sea
- List of islands of Saudi Arabia
- List of islands of Yemen
