= List of islands by name (D) =

This article features a list of islands sorted by their name beginning with the letter D.

== D ==
Island's Name	Island group(s)	Country/Countries
Daga	Lake Tana	Ethiopia
Dahlak Kebir	Dahlak Archipelago	Eritrea
Daishan	Zhoushan Archipelago	China
Dakhin Shahbazpur	Meghna River estuary	Bangladesh
Daksa	Elaphiti Islands	Croatia
Dalkey	Dún Laoghaire Harbor	Ireland
Dalma	Persian Gulf	United Arab Emirates
Damsay	The North Isles, Orkney	Scotland
Dänholm	Strelasund, Mecklenburg-Vorpommern	Germany
Danna	Inner Hebrides	Scotland
Dara	Persian Gulf	Iran
Darakasi	Bajuni Islands	Somalia
Darch	North Channel, Ontario	Canada
Dardenne	Mississippi River, Missouri	United States
Darrow Bar	Willamette River, Oregon	United States
Dassen	Atlantic Ocean	South Africa
Dauphin	Alabama	United States
Davaar	Islands of the Clyde	Scotland
Davis	Thimble Islands, Connecticut	United States
Davis	Hillsborough River, Florida	United States
Davis	Ohio River, Pennsylvania	United States
Dawson Island	Antártica Chilena Province	Chile
Dead	Georgian Bay, Ontario	Canada
Deadman	Washington	United States
Deadman's Cay	Leeward Islands in the Lesser Antilles	Anguilla
Deans	Whitefish Lake, Ontario	Canada
Deasker	Monach Islands	Scotland
Debre Sina	Lake Zway	Ethiopia
Decatur	San Juan Islands, Washington	United States
Deer	Gloucester Pool, Ontario	Canada
Deer	Louisiana	United States
Deer	Mississippi	United States
Dehalak Deset	Dahlak Archipelago	Eritrea
Dek	Lake Tana	Ethiopia
Delos	Cyclades	Greece
Denman	Gulf Islands, British Columbia	Canada
Denmark	Mississippi River, Illinois	United States
Dennery	Leeward Islands	Saint Lucia
Dennison	Kawagama Lake, Ontario	Canada
Isle Dernieres	Lake Pelto,Louisiana	United States
Dernish	Upper Lough Erne	Ireland
Derryinch	Lower Lough Erne	Ireland
Des Bateaux	Leeward Islands	Saint Lucia
Deserta Grande	Madeira Islands	Portugal
La Désirade	Guadeloupe, Lesser Antilles	France
Devenish	Lower Lough Erne	Ireland
Devil	Lake Huron, Ontario	Canada
Devon	Queen Elizabeth Islands, Nunavut	Canada
Dexterity	Nunavut	Canada
Dharmadam	Kerala	India
Dhuladhiya	Dahlak Archipelago	Eritrea
Dia	Crete	Greece
Diamond	Illinois River, Illinois	United States
Diamond	Ohio River, Kentucky	United States
Diamond	Lake Winnipesaukee, New Hampshire	United States
Diamond	Grenadines	Grenada
Diamond Rock	Martinique in the Lesser Antilles	France
Dickinson	Tennessee River, Tennessee	United States
Dike	Grenadines in the Windward Islands	Saint Vincent and the Grenadines
Dillon	Mississippi River, Illinois	United States
Dinas	Pembrokeshire	Wales
Disappointment	Auckland Islands	New Zealand
Dissei	Dahlak Archipelago	Eritrea
Diu	Daman and Diu	India
Djerba	Gulf of Gabès	Tunisia
Dodan	Leeward Islands	Saint Kitts and Nevis
Dog	Gulf of Mexico, Florida	United States
Dog	Leeward Islands in the Lesser Antilles	Anguilla
Dohul	Dahlak Archipelago	Eritrea
Dolphin	Greater Antilles	Jamaica
Dolphin	Great Salt Lake, Utah	United States
Domariba-sziget	Danube River	Hungary
Dominica	Lesser Antilles	Dominica
Don Pedro	Gulf of Mexico, Florida	United States
Dønna	Nordland	Norway
Donoussa	Cyclades	Greece
Donsö	Southern Gothenburg Archipelago	Sweden
Dordrecht	Island part of the Dutch province South Holland	Netherlands
Douglas	Fraser River, British Columbia	Canada
Dove Cay	Grenadines in the Windward Islands	Saint Vincent and the Grenadines
Dove	Grenadines in the Windward Islands	Saint Vincent and the Grenadines
Dow	Lake Winnipesaukee, New Hampshire	United States
Dowager	British Columbia	Canada
Dragonera island of dragons	Balearic Islands	Spain
Drejø	Islands south of Funen	Denmark
Drenec	Glénan islands	France
Dresser	Mississippi River, Missouri	United States
Drews	Louisiana	United States
Drvenik Mali	Adriatic Sea	Croatia
Drvenik Veliki	Adriatic Sea	Croatia
Dubh Artach	Inner Hebrides	Scotland
Ducie	Pitcairn Islands	(United Kingdom) British overseas territories
Duck	Lake Huron, Ontario	Canada
Duds	Lake Winnipesaukee, New Hampshire	United States
Dugi Otok	Adriatic Sea	Croatia
Duke of York	Duke of York Islands	Papua New Guinea
Dulcina	Leeward Islands	Antigua and Barbuda
Dulcina	Leeward Islands	Saint Kitts and Nevis
Dùn	St. Kilda archipelago	Scotland
Dún Channuill	Garvellachs group in the Inner Hebrides	Scotland
Dunasziget	Danube River	Hungary
Dundas	British Columbia	Canada
Dunk Island	Queensland	Australia
Dunn	Mississippi River, Minnesota	United States
Dupre	Martinique in the Lesser Antilles	France
Durnam	Mississippi River, Minnesota	United States
Dursey	Beara Peninsula, County Cork	Ireland
Duvernette	Grenadines in the Windward Islands	Saint Vincent and the Grenadines

== See also ==
- List of islands (by country)
- List of islands by area
- List of islands by population
- List of islands by highest point
