= The Master (The Doctor Who Role Playing Game) =

Tabletop role-playing game supplement

Cover of the gamemaster's book

Cover of the player's book

The Master is a supplement published by FASA in 1985 for The Doctor Who Role Playing Game, which is based on the long-running BBC science fiction television series Doctor Who.

== Contents ==
The Master contains information about The Doctor's nemesis, The Master. The supplement is divided into two books: a 64-page gamemaster's booklet with accurate background information about The Master, including history, background, and activities, as well as notes on how to give The Master an authentic feel, and statistics for some other opponents of The Doctor, including Daemons, The Nestene Consciousness, Axos and Ogrons; and a 24-page booklet with information for players titled "The Master – CIA File Extracts", supposedly written by the Celestial Intervention Agency. The information in the player's book may or may not be accurate. As reviewer Barry Bailey noted, "the players' booklet is carefully compiled as a mixture of truth, inaccuracies, lies, damn lies and statistics." Although these two booklets were originally sold together, they are usually found separately on the used book market. Since there have been more players than gamemasters, the player's booklet is rarer than the gamemaster's book.

== Publication history ==
FASA published The Doctor Who Roleplaying Game in 1985, and quickly released two adventures, The Lords of Destiny, and The Iytean Menace, as well as several supplements about foes of The Doctor, including The Daleks, The Cybermen, and this one, The Master.

The Master was written by J. Andrew Keith, with additional material by Michael P. Bledsoe, William H. Keith Jr., and Tom Kokkelenberg. Artwork was by Jane K. Bigos, Todd F. Marsh, and Lucy A. Synk.

== Reception ==
In the May 1986 edition of White Dwarf (Issue #77), Barry Bailey reviewed both The Master and The Daleks, which had been released simultaneously, and said of The Master that it "unaccountably has inferior production to earlier FASA Doctor Who products. Apart from the cunningly composed cover, the illustration is generally weak." Bailey noted that the statistics given for The Doctor's opponents in this supplement differed in format from those given in The Daleks, commenting, "it would appear that the Dr Who RPG is very poorly co-ordinated as a project." He also disagreed with some reworking of the Doctor Who canon, calling it an "irritating rewriting of the Dr Who mythos." Bailey was ambivalent about the usefulness of either The Daleks or The Master, and gave them both an average overall rating of 7 out of 10, saying, "If you intend using either of the two villains regularly, and don't feel you know enough from the series to be able to handle them, then you should use these supplements. Otherwise you'd probably be better trusting to your own judgement."

== Reviews ==
- Comics Feature #45
