= Dahlak =

Dahlak may refer to:

- Dahlak Archipelago, an island chain in the Red Sea
- Sultanate of Dahlak
- Dahlik language, a language spoken on three of those islands and in parts of Eritrea
- Dahlak subregion, part of Eritrea's Northern Red Sea region

== See also ==
- Dalek (disambiguation)
