= The Daleks (The Doctor Who Role Playing Game) =

Role-playing game supplement

Cover of the gamemaster's book, art by Jim Holloway

Cover of the player's book

The Daleks is a supplement published by FASA in 1985 for The Doctor Who Role Playing Game, which is based on the long-running BBC science fiction television series Doctor Who.

== Contents ==
The Daleks contains information about Doctor Who's longest running adversary, the Daleks. The supplement is divided into two books: a 40-page gamemaster's booklet with truthful background information about the Daleks, including society, history, tactics, and physiology; and a 24-page booklet with information for players titled "The Dalek Problem – A Symposium", supposedly written by the Celestial Intervention Agency. The information in the player's book may or may not be accurate. As reviewer Barry Bailey noted, "the players' booklet is carefully compiled as a mixture of truth, inaccuracies, lies, damn lies and statistics." Although these two booklets were originally sold together, they are usually found separately on the used book market. Since there have been more players than gamemasters, the player's booklet is rarer than the gamemaster's book.

== Publication history ==
FASA published The Doctor Who Roleplaying Game in 1985, and quickly released two adventures, The Lords of Destiny, and The Iytean Menace, as well as several supplements about foes of The Doctor, including The Master and this one, The Daleks.

The Daleks was designed by the staff writers of Fantasimulation Associates, Guy McLimore Jr., Greg Poehlein, and David F. Tepool. Interior art was by Dana Andrews, Jane K. Bigos, James Holloway, David J. Hutchins, Todd F. Marsh, Jordan Weisman, and James Holloway; Holloway also provided the cover art for the gamemaster's book.

== Reception ==
In the May 1986 edition of White Dwarf (Issue #77), Barry Bailey reviewed both The Daleks and The Master, which had been released simultaneously. Bailey complimented FASA for including updated rules on the Daleks that made them much harder to damage in combat, but criticized FASA for the necessity of including this information in a supplement rather than the original rules, saying, "I wonder, however, why it was necessary to do this in a supplement? FASA should have got it right first time - anything else deserves the strongest criticism." Although Bailey was not pleased by the introduction of many new rules, which required integration with the original Doctor Who game rules, he was impressed by the "Dalek Combat Flowchart". Bailey was ambivalent about the usefulness of either The Daleks or The Master, and gave them both an average overall rating of 7 out of 10, saying, "If you intend using either of the two villains regularly, and don't feel you know enough from the series to be able to handle them, then you should use these supplements. Otherwise you'd probably be better trusting to your own judgement."

== Reviews ==
- Comics Feature #45
