= Dalek (disambiguation) =

A Dalek is a member of a race of aliens in Doctor Who media.

Dalek or Daleks may also refer to:

== Doctor Who ==
- The Daleks, a 1963–64 serial of Doctor Who
  - Doctor Who: The Daleks, the soundtrack featuring music from the serial
- "The Daleks", a 1964 episode of the Doctor Who serial The Dalek Invasion of Earth
- "Dalek" (Doctor Who episode), a 2005 episode of Doctor Who
- The Daleks (The Doctor Who Role Playing Game), a 1985 role-playing supplement

== Other uses ==
- Dalek (artist) (born 1968 as James Marshall), American artist
- Dälek, a hip hop duo from New Jersey
- Daleks (video game) or Robots
- Bridgewater Place or the Dalek, a skyscraper in Leeds, England
- Dalek, a BBC Two ident

== See also ==
- Dahlak Archipelago, an island group in the Red Sea
- Dahlik language, a language spoken in Eritrea and the Dahlak islands
- Dalet, a letter of the Hebrew alphabet
- Robert Dallek, American historian
