= Sultanate of Dahlak =

Small medieval kingdom covering the Dahlak Archipelago in East Africa

Dahlak Sultanate سلطنة دهلك
- 960–1557
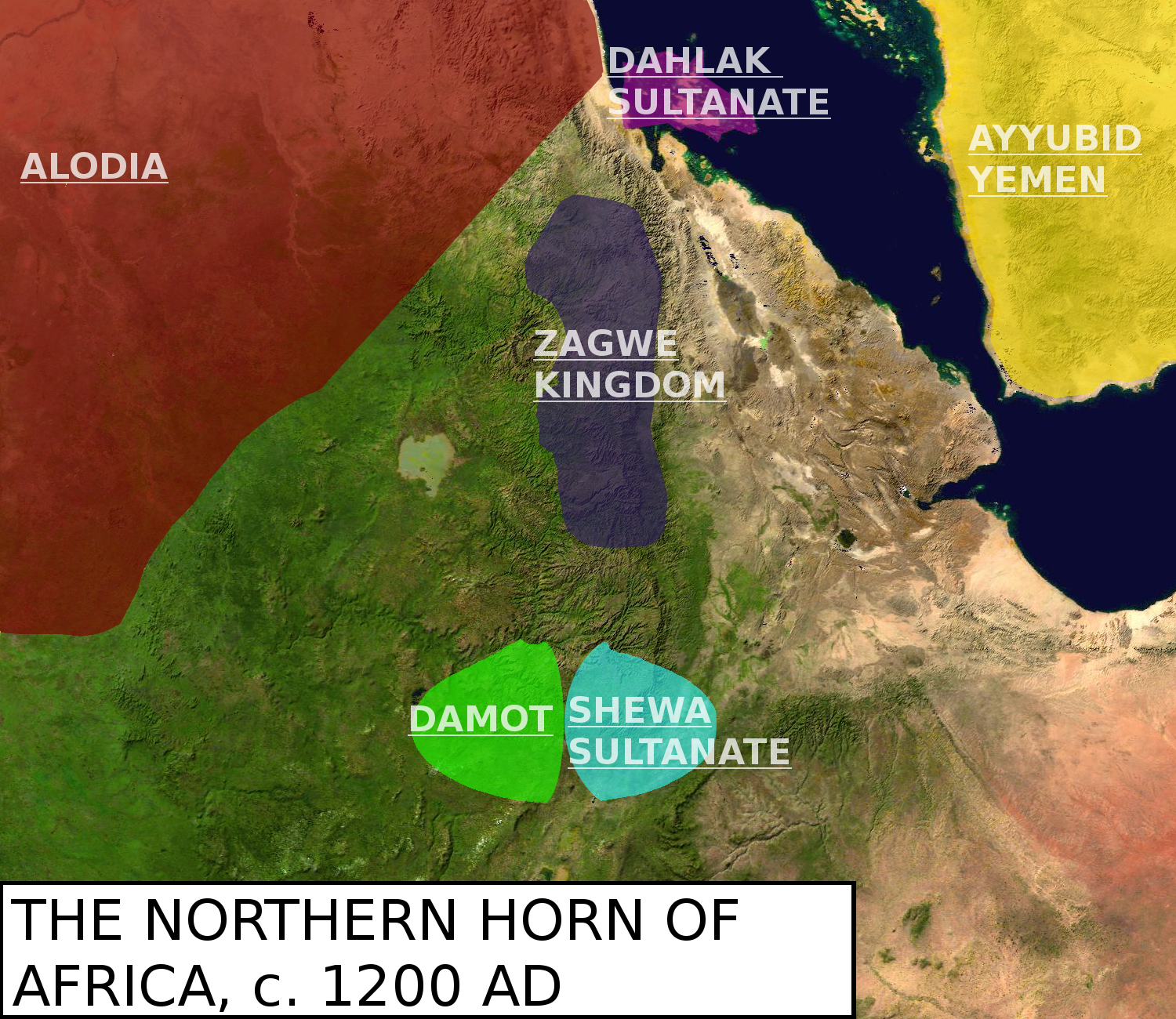
- The Dahlak sultanate and its neighbours, c. 1200
- Capital: Dahlak Kebir
- Common languages: Arabic, Dahalik
- Religion: Islam
- Government: Monarchy
- Sultan
  - ?-1093: Mubarak
  - ?-14??: Ismail
  - ?-1540: Ahmad (last known sultan)
- Historical era: Middle Ages
  - Established: 960
  - Tributary of the Ethiopian Empire: 1464/65
  - Annexed by the Ottomans: 1557
- Currency: Dinar
Preceded by	Succeeded by
Kingdom of Aksum	Ottoman Empire
- Today part of: Eritrea

The Sultanate of Dahlak was a small Arab medieval kingdom covering the Dahlak Archipelago and parts of the Eritrean coast. First attested in 1093, it quickly profited from its strategic trading location, gaining heavily from being near to Yemen as well as Egypt and India. After the mid 13th century Dahlak lost its trade monopoly and subsequently started to decline. Both the Ethiopian empire and Yemen tried to enforce their authority over the sultanate. It was eventually annexed by the Ottomans in 1557, who made it part of the Habesh Eyalet.

== History ==
=== Origins and early history ===
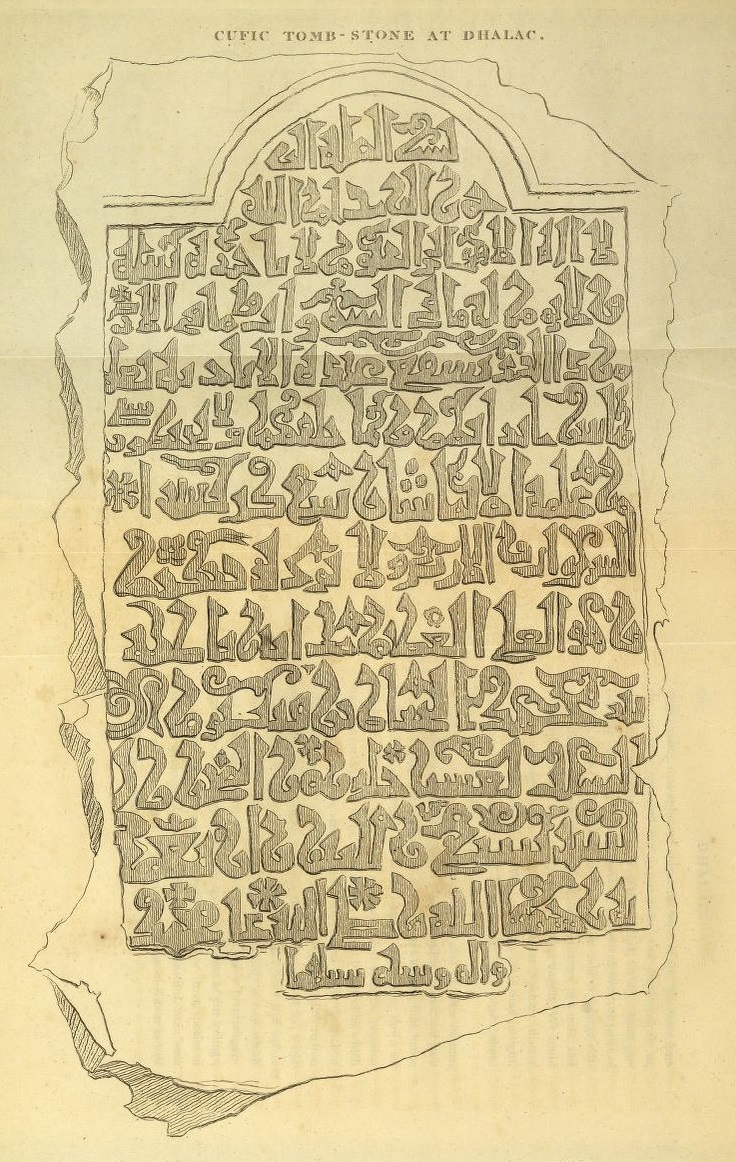
Tombstone from Dahlak with Kufic inscription

After the Umayyads seized Dahlak in 702, they made it a prison and place of forced exile, as did the early Abbasids who succeeded them. By the 9th century, the Dahlak islands had come under the rule of the king of Abyssinia. Around 900, he concluded a treaty of friendship with the Ziyadid sultan of Zabid in Yemen, and by the mid 10th century, it is recorded that Dahlak was forced to pay tribute to Sultan Ishaq ibn Ibrahim. A century later, Dahlak was involved in a power struggle between the Ziyadids and the Najahids, as the sons of Najah fled to the islands after he died in 1061. Battles were fought until 1086, when the Najahids managed to restore their rule in Zabid. It was in the second half of the 11th century, under the rule of the Najahids, when the Dahlak archipelago prospered the most.

The first sultan who is attestable is Sultan Mubarak, whose funerary stele records his death in 1093. His dynasty apparently lasted until 1230/1249. It was during this period, the 11th–mid 13th century, that the Sultanate enjoyed its greatest prosperity. This prosperity was mostly based on the monopoly of the external trade of the Medri Bahri, but also involvement in the transit trade between Egypt and India. It was also through Dahlak that Midre Bahri maintained diplomatic relations with Yemen. In the mid 13th century, however, the Zagwe kings began to make use of a new trading route in the south, with the port town Zeila as its final destination. Thus Dahlak lost its trading monopoly. Around the same time, Ibn Sa'id al-Maghribi records that the Dahlak sultans struggled to stay independent from the Rasulids.

From the 12th century, the sultans of Dahlak controlled the important trading town of Massawa on the African Red Sea coast, which was governed by a deputy titled the Nai'b. Other coastal settlements on the African continent might have been controlled by the Dahlak sultans as well, at least temporarily. To the Abyssinians, the sultan of Dahlak was known as Seyuma Bahr ("Prefect of the Sea"), in contrast to the Bahr Negash ("Lord of the Sea") of Medri Bahri.

It was shortly after the death of Sultan Mubarak that the Dahlak sultanate began to mint coins, which were used to pay for imported goods such as Egyptian textiles and storax balsam.

The Muslims of Dahlak were probably not successful in proselytizing Medri Bahri. The Ethiopian Orthodox Tewahedo Church had been well-established for centuries.

=== Demise ===
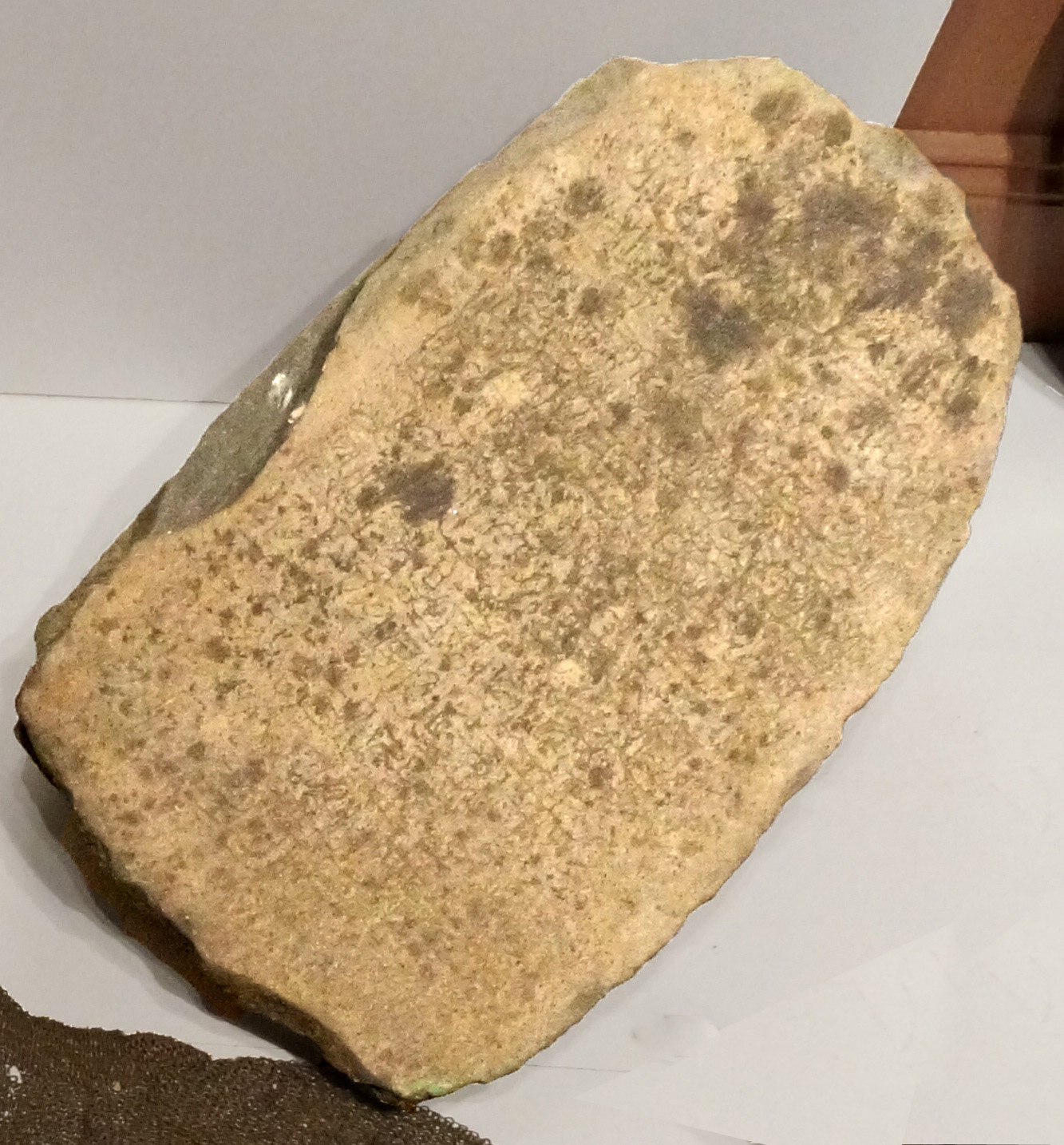
Tombstone of sultan Ahmad, who died in 1540

By the 15th century the economy of the sultanate was in decline. In 1464–65, Massawa and the Dahlak archipelago were pillaged by the Ethiopian emperor Zara Yaqob, during which the local qadi was killed. By 1513 Dahlak had become a vassal of the Tahirids. In 1517 and 1520 it came into conflict with the Portuguese Empire, resulting in much destruction. By 1526 sultan Ahmad had submitted to the Portuguese and committed himself to pay 3,000 pardaos annually. There was a short revival of the sultanate during the Ethiopian-Adal War, when sultan Ahmad allied with the Adal Sultanate against the Ethiopian Empire. Sultan Ahmad joined Adal and was rewarded with the port town of Arkiko. However, in 1541, one year after the death of Sultan Ahmad, the Portuguese returned and destroyed Dahlak yet again. His stele describes him as a fighter for the faith and gives his death as 24 February 1540. Sixteen years later, the islands were occupied by the Ottoman Empire, who made them part of the Habesh Eyalet. Under the rule of the Ottomans, the Dahlak islands lost their significance.

== Dahlak Kebir ==
Dahlak Kebir, a site on the same-named Dahlak Kebir Island, contains material dating to the era of the sultanate. More than 260 tombstones have been discovered. They attest the presence of a cosmopolitan population originating from all over the Islamic world. Several, now deteriorating, qubbas have been noted. The settlement itself consisted of well-built stone houses made of coral. The site also contains several settlement mounds. The medieval population used sophisticated cisterns to ensure a continuous supply of freshwater.

== Sources ==
- Bosworth, Clifford Edmund (2007). Historic Cities of the Islamic World. Brill. ISBN 9789004153882.
- Chekroun, Amélie; Hirsch, Bertrand (2020). "The Sultanates of Medieval Ethiopia". A Companion to Medieval Ethiopia and Eritrea". Brill. pp. 86–112.
- Connel, Dan; Killion, Tom (2011). Historical Dictionary of Eritrea. The Scarecrow. ISBN 9780810859524.
- Insoll, Timothy (1997). "An Archaeological Reconnaissance made to Dahlak Kebir, the Dahlak Islands, Eritrea: Preliminary Observations". Ethiopia in Broader Perspective: Papers of the 13th International Conference of Ethiopian Studies. Volume 1. pp. 382–388. ISBN 4879749761.
- Margariti, Roxolani Eleni (2009). "Thieves of Sultans? Dahlak and the Rulers and Merchants of Indian Ocean Port Cities, 11th-13th Centuries AD". Connected Hinterlands. Proceedings of Red Sea Project IV. pp. 155–163. ISBN 9781407306315.
- Pankhurst, Richard (1997). The Ethiopian Borderlands: Essays in Regional History from Ancient Times to the End of the 18th Century. ISBN 9780932415189.
- Tamrat, Tadesse (1977). "Ethiopia, the Red Sea and the Horn". In Roland Oliver (ed.). The Cambridge History of Africa. Vol. 3. Cambridge University. pp. 89–182. ISBN 0521209811.
- van Donzel, Emeri; Kon, Ronald E. (2005). "Dahlak islands. History of the Dahlak islands until 1945". Encyclopedia Aethiopica. D-Ha. Harrassowitz. pp. 64–69. ISBN 3447052384.
