= Nakura =

Island in Eritrea

Coordinates: 15°42′39″N 39°56′19″E

Nakura or Nokra is an Eritrean island in the Dahlak Archipelago situated west of Dahlak Kebir. Nakura has an area of 6.44 km^{2}, and reaches a height of 48 meters.

During Italian colonization (1890/91), it was used as the Nocra prison camp. Its grim history is vividly depicted in Eritrean songs.

Amnesty International and other human rights groups have complained of maltreatment of inmates at the prison on the island. It noted in December 2005 that "many political prisoners and prisoners of conscience are detained without charge or trial" at the prison. A former detainee told Amnesty International in 2004 "that some prisoners detained in Nakura prison who belonged to evangelical churches were punished with torture by tying on account of secretly having bibles in the prison, and their bibles were burned in front of them".

Christian Solidarity Worldwide noted in June 2017 that 33 Protestant women were being held in the "infamous island prison" which it also described as a "notoriously harsh prison island".
