= The Hartlewick Horror =

Tabletop role-playing game adventure

Cover art by Jim Holloway, featuring an image of the Fourth Doctor, 1985

The Hartlewick Horror is an adventure published by FASA in 1985 for The Doctor Who Role Playing Game, itself based on the long-running BBC television series Doctor Who.

== Plot summary ==
The player characters, usually consisting of one or more Time Lords and their Companions, are sent to Earth in 1923 by the Celestial Intervention Agency to investigate a large energy field centred on the English village of Hartlewick, where a number of people have recently disappeared at night. The characters will eventually discover an ancient alien imprisoned underground who is using its telepathic powers to force the local villagers and an archaeologist to free it.

Pregenerated characters are provided for the Fourth Doctor, and his well-known companions Leela, Sarah Jane Smith, and Harry Sullivan.

== Publication history ==
The Hartlewick Horror, a 40-page book with a cardstock card published by FASA in 1985, was written by Ray Winninger with interior art by Jane Bigos and Todd Marsh, and cover art by David Deitrick.

== Reception ==
In the August 1986 edition of the British magazine White Dwarf (Issue #80), Barry Bailey reviewed both The Hartlewick Horror and another Doctor Who adventure, The Legions of Death, and said of The Hartlewick Horror, "You could be forgiven for thinking it was a scenario for a certain popular rolegame with the initials CoC." Bailey thought the plot "was simple, and designed for less experienced players", but he admitted that those players would "find it very entertaining." He also noted that "players were guided through it, without being too obvious that there was manipulation involved." However, Bailey criticized the American designer for a lack of research, "apparently unaware of the distinctive differences between English and American towns." He concluded that, compared to The Legions of Death, "The Hartlewick Horror is the better of the two scenarios, and should provide a solid one or two sessions' gaming."

== Reviews ==
- Comics Feature #45
