= Inghel =

Inghel (also spelled Ingal) is a populated place on the peninsular of Dahlak archipelago in the Red Sea, located in Semēnawī Kʼeyih Bahrī, Eritrea. The terrain elevation of Inghel is estimated as 26 metres above sea level.

== See also ==
- Provinces of Eritrea
