= Al-Ahwas Al-Ansari =

7th century classical Arabic poet from Madinah

"Al-Ahwas" Al-Ansari
- Born: Abdullah bin Mohammed bin Abdullah bin Asim bin Thabit al-Ansari c. 35 AH/655 AD; Madinah, Umayyad Caliphate
- Died: c. 110 AH/728-29 AD; Damascus, Umayyad Caliphate
- Occupation: Poet
- Writing career
- Language: Arabic
- Period: Umayyad Caliphate
- Genres: Satire, Ghazel
- Notable work: Diwan Al-Ahwas Al-Ansari (Collection of poems)

Abdullah bin Mohammed bin Abdullah bin Asim bin Thabit al-Ansari (variant:ʿAbd Allāh bin Muḥammad bin ʿAbd Allāh bin ʿĀṣim bin Ṯẖābit Al-Anṣārī) (Arabic: عبدالله بن محمد بن عبد الله بن عاصم بن ثابت الأنصاري) also known as "Al-Ahwas" Al-Ansari (Arabic: الأحوص الأنصاري) or simply as Al-Ahwas (Arabic: الأحوص) was a satirical Arab poet from Madinah living under the rule of the Umayyad Caliphate. Along with Umar ibn Abi Rabi'ah, he is one of the representatives of the literary form of ghazel which became popular in the urban centers of the Umayyad Caliphate, but his better known works were his satirical poems, which influenced later satirical poets like Abu Nawas and Al-Jahiz.

The nickname of "Al-Ahwas" ("The one that squints") was given to him due to the fact that he couldn't open one eye fully due to the tightness of the eyelid muscles, making it seem that he was constantly squinting.

== Biography ==
Al-Ahwas was born in 35 AH (655 AD) in Madinah. He belonged to the Ansar from Madinah, more specifically to the Banu Aws tribe, and during his life he rose to enough prominence in the tribe to become the mouth-piece of the Ansar. He was part of the rich and noble classes of Madinah and lived through the Battle of al-Harra, in which the Ansar and other member of Medinan society rebelled against the rule of the very unpopular caliph Yazid I, and were later quelled by Yazid I's forces.

Al-Ahwas was an acquaintance of caliph Al-Walid I and frequented the caliph's parties; however, after it came out that Al-Ahwas tried to seduce some of the boy servants of another guest to have intercourse with him, he lost the caliph's favor and even got whipped by the order of the then governor of Madinah and future caliph, Umar ibn Abd al-Aziz. (Note: Sources differ on which caliph ordered and which governor followed through with the whipping of Al-Ahwas, if it was governor Umar by the order of caliph Al-Walid, or governor Ibn Hazm by the order of caliph Sulayman.) When Al-Walid died and the new caliph Sulayman ibn Abd al-Malik appointed the qadi Ibn Hazm as governor of Madinah, Al-Ahwas wrote a satirical poem in which he slandered the new governor and attacked the caliph. These offensive attacks, along with his constant love affairs, accusations of homosexuality and his passive role in intercourse, his purported effeminateness (being publicly called a "Mukhannathun" by caliph Abd al-Malik ibn Marwan), his conflicts with members of Medinan aristocracy, his perceived immorality, his pederasty, his overall negative reputation, and the fact that he was a prominent member of the Ansar, which headed the rebellion against the Umayyad caliphate some years prior; were the cause for his exile to the Dahlak Kebir island in the Red Sea, as mandated by the caliph Sulayman, around 96-7 AH (715 AD); although the most commonly given reason for his banishment was that he constantly mentioned aristocratic women by name in his love poems, against Medinan society's mores.

He remained in exile during the remainder of Sulayman's reign and the entirety of Umar ibn Abd al-Aziz's (Umar II) time as caliph. After Umar's death the Ansar pleaded for Al-Ahwas' return to the new caliph, Yazid II, who finally freed and befriended him. Because the caliph became very fond and close to Al-Ahwas, he moved to the Umayyad court in Damascus and started writing satiric poems against the Muhallabids, Yazid's political enemies. He remained in Damascus until his dead, due to illness, in 110 AH (728-29 AD).

== Work and style ==
He was recognized as an excellent poet during his lifetime, an opinion which has been maintained to this day in the Arab-speaking world, and his work influenced other important authors, like the satirical poet Abu Nawas, whom in turn influenced the Andalucian poet Ibn Quzman.

As with many other Arabic poets, Al-Ahwas' poems were published as a "Diwan" (Compilation of Poems), known as "Diwan Al-Ahwas Al-Ansari" (Arabic: ديوان الأحوص الأنصاري), which is sporadically republished to this day. However, no full translation of this text into English has been made, except for some poems as part of a collection of Arabic Poetry translated into English by Charles Greville Tuetey.

His poetry has been compared in style and quality to that of Umar ibn Abi Rabi'ah, and is described as highly rhythmical an aesthetically pleasing due to his use of parallelism of terms between verses, of repetition and of epanalepsis, which is the repetition of the first word of a verse at its end.

His main literary compositions were ghazel (love poems), fakhr (boasting poems), hija (lampooning poems) and madih (panegyric poems); although his most know works are his satirical poems.

== Sources ==
- Petráček, Karel (2008). "Al-Ahwas". In Bearman, P.; Bianquis, Th.; Bosworth, C.E.; van Donzel, E.; Heinrichs, W.P. (eds.). Encyclopaedia of Islam (2 ed.). Brill. doi:10.1163/1573-3912_islam_SIM_0436. ISBN 9789004161214.
