= Dahlak Marine National Park =

National park in Eritrea

Dahlak (Dahlac) Marine National Park is a national park in the Northern Red Sea Region of Eritrea. It includes part of the Dahlak archipelago and the surrounding waters.

Permission must be acquired before being allowed to travel to Dahlak Marine National Park. The park is flourishing with wildlife and there are an estimated 325 different species of fish in the waters surrounding the region. Many of the uninhabited islands have become nesting areas for large numbers of seabirds due to their isolated nature and rich feeding grounds in the surrounding area.

Apart from the wildlife, there is a small population of 2,500 people that live on four of the islands. These people maintain their traditional lifestyle of herding goats and camels, as well as fishing. Scuba diving is now allowed in the area and is led by a group of trained scuba divers that consist of former freedom fighters that make up the core of Eritrean diving tourism.

Marine species seen in the area include:

- Bannerfish
- Blue-spotted fantail ray
- Boxfish
- Butterflyfish
- Cardinalfish
- Damselfish
- Diamondfish
- Dottyback
- Dugong
- Goatfish
- Great barracuda
- Gregories
- Green sea turtle
- Grouper
- Hawksbill sea turtle
- Mangrove red snapper
- Mullets
- Parrotfish
- Rabbitfish
- Silverbiddy
- Squirrelfish
- Surgeonfish
- Tangs
- Trumpetfish
- Wrasses
- Zebra shark
