= The Doctor Who Role Playing Game =

Tabletop science fiction role-playing game

- Publishers: FASA
- Publication: 1985
- Genres: Science fiction
- Systems: Custom

The Doctor Who Role Playing Game is a licensed roleplaying game published by FASA in 1985 that is based upon the BBC television series Doctor Who.

== Description ==
The Doctor Who Role Playing Game allows players to assume roles similar to the Doctor and his companions or to become agents of the Celestial Intervention Agency. The game uses a revision of the role-playing system originally developed for FASA's Star Trek RPG.

== Publication history ==
FASA acquired a license to produce a role-playing game based on Doctor Who, and a game was developed by Guy W. McLimore Jr. and William John Wheeler. FASA published the game in 1985 with illustrations by Jane K. Bigos, David R. Deitrick, William H. Keith Jr., Dana M. Knutson, Dave R. Marsh, and Todd F. Marsh. The boxed set contains a 48-page "Player's Manual", an 82-page "Game Operations Manual" and a 64-page A Sourcebook for Field Agents." The box cover features the Fourth Doctor and Leela, although by the time of publication, they were no longer involved in the television series.

FASA published two solo play gamebooks based on the game:

- Doctor Who and the Vortex Crystal (1986) by William H. Keith, Jr., featuring the Fourth Doctor, Sarah Jane Smith, and Harry Sullivan and the Daleks, set on the planet Gathwyr.
- Doctor Who and the Rebel's Gambit (1986, ISBN 0-931787-68-8) by William H. Keith, Jr., featuring the Sixth Doctor, Peri, and Harry Sullivan, set during the American Civil War.

FASA published three supplements to add more background:

- FASA 9101 The Daleks (The Doctor Who Role Playing Game) (1985) A two-part module that includes full details about the Daleks' back story and a new scenario. ISBN 0-931787-93-9
- FASA 9102 The Master (1985) ISBN 0-931787-94-7
- FASA 9103 The Cybermen (1985) This includes "Cyber Files: CIA Special Report" ISBN 0-931787-73-4

FASA also published seven adventures:

- FASA 9201 The Iytean Menace (1985) Set in Victorian England.ISBN 0-931787-91-2
- FASA 9202 The Lords of Destiny (1985) Set in a giant starship and mobile world. ISBN 0-931787-92-0
- FASA 9203 Countdown (1985) The TARDIS materializes aboard a ship of the Earth Empire on an emergency medical mission. ISBN 0-931787-95-5
- FASA 9204 The Hartlewick Horror (1985) Set in the English village of Harlewick, where residents are disappearing. ISBN 0-931787-75-0
- FASA 9205 The Legions of Death (1985) Set in Iron Age Britain during the Roman invasion. ISBN 0-931787-26-2
- FASA 9206 City of Gold (1986) Set on Earth in the 21st century. ISBN 0-931787-49-1
- FASA 9207 The Warrior's Code (1986) Set in feudal Japan. ISBN 0-931787-36-X

== Reception ==
Paul Mason reviewed The Doctor Who Role Playing Game for White Dwarf #72, giving it an overall rating of 8 out of 10, and stated that "I can appreciate what an achievement it is to wrap together the Doctor Who mythos into a coherent whole, having tried it myself - there has been a lot of effort put into this game, and it shows."

In Issue 41 of Different Worlds, Scott Slingsby was critical of the game, writing, "The TV programs are classics in the truest sense of the word. The role-playing game is not! In other words, the BBC series is humorous, exciting, interesting, and a lot of fun. On the other hand, reading FASA's Doctor Who can best be described as work ... The rules are dull, repetitive, and lacking in originality." Slingsby concluded by giving the game a below-average rating of 2 out of 4, saying, "FASA may have reproduced the body of the Doctor and his universe, but they did not capture the series' soul."

In his 1990 book The Complete Guide to Role-Playing Games, game critic Rick Swan was disappointed, writing, "Doctor Who strives mightily to capture the flavor of the long-running British TV series, but though it gets all the details right, it misses the essence. Doctor Who — the series — is witty and fun. Doctor Who — the game — is dry and dull." Swan thought the game mechanics were "adequate but unimpressive", but was impressed by the plethora of background material. Swan concluded by giving the game a rating of 2.5 out of 4, saying, "Doctor Who loyalists are likely to enjoy it, but players who've never heard of the Doctor will probably wonder what the fuss is all about."

In a retrospective review of The Doctor Who Role Playing Game in Black Gate, Ty Johnston said "Over all, The Dr. Who Roleplaying Game could be a blast to play, as I rediscovered a few years ago when I got to experience it once again with a group in a short campaign."

== Other reviews ==
- The V.I.P. of Gaming Magazine #3 (April/May, 1986)
- Comics Feature #43

== See also ==
- Time Lord, another Doctor Who RPG
- Doctor Who: Adventures in Time and Space RPG.
