= The Legions of Death =

Role-playing game supplement

Cover art by Harry Quinn, featuring the Third Doctor, 1985

The Legions of Death is an adventure published by FASA in 1985 for The Doctor Who Role Playing Game, itself based on the long-running BBC television series Doctor Who..

== Plot summary ==
The player characters, usually composed of a Time Lord and Companions, are alerted to the unauthorized presence of a TARDIS in England during the Roman invasion of Britain in 43 CE. The renegade Time Lord is threatening the fabric of time by blunting the Romans' invasion, kidnapping Vespasian and sending assassins to kill Claudius.

Pregenerated characters for the Third Doctor and popular Companions Jo Grant and Sarah Jane Smith are provided. A player's handout is also provided, although reviewer Barry Bailey noted that it has "some pertinent information, some irrelevancies and some misinformation."

== Publication history ==
The Legions of Death was written by J. Andrew Keith, with a cover by Harry Quinn and illustrations by Jane Bigos and Todd F. Marsh, and was published by FASA in 1985 as a 52-page book with a cardstock card.

== Reception ==
In the August 1986 edition of White Dwarf (Issue #80), Barry Bailey reviewed both The Legions of Death and another Doctor Who adventure, The Hartlewick Horror, and said of The Legions of Death, "This module is rather longer than The Hartlewick Horror, but I don't feel the extra space has been used as well as it might have been. Far less guidance has been given in running this adventure." He criticized the complete absence of maps, and also noted that the large amount of gamemaster notes and historical background about the Roman invasion of Britain was presented separately rather than being integrated into the plot. Bailey warned that "If you want to run this scenario, you should be at least mildly interested in the Romans and their history, and the ancient Britons." He concluded that The Hartlewick Horror was the better of the two scenarios, saying "The Legions of Death might provide more, but its lack of such things as maps may well flummox an inexperienced referee."
