= The Master (Doctor Who) =

Character in TV series Doctor Who

- Doctor Who character
- The faces of the Master as depicted in the television programme The Master as portrayed on-screen in chronological order, left to right from top row.
- First appearance: Terror of the Autons (1971)
- Created by: Terrance Dicks; Barry Letts
- Portrayed by: Main incarnations: Roger Delgado (1971–1973); Peter Pratt (1976); Geoffrey Beevers (1981); Anthony Ainley (1981–1989); Eric Roberts (1996); Derek Jacobi (2007) (Note: Jacobi also voiced a robot duplicate of the Master in Scream of the Shalka (2003).); John Simm (2007–2010, 2017); Michelle Gomez (2014–2017); Sacha Dhawan (2020–2022); Others: Gordon Tipple (1996); William Hughes (child, 2007); Actors in audio plays; Jonathan Pryce (1999)

Character biography
- Aliases: Emil Keller, Professor Thascales, Colonel Masters, Martin Jurgens, Reverend Magister, Kalid, Sir Gilles Estram, Professor Yana, Harold Saxon, Razor, Missy (Mistress), Agent O, Grigori Rasputin
- Species: Time Lord
- Home planet: Gallifrey

The Master, or "Missy" (short for "Mistress") is a recurring character and one of the main antagonists of the British science fiction television series Doctor Who and its associated spin-off works.

Multiple actors have played the Master since the character's introduction in 1971. Within the show's narrative, the change in actors and subsequent change of the character's appearance is sometimes explained as the Master taking possession of other characters' bodies or as a consequence of regeneration, which is a biological attribute that allows Time Lords to survive fatal injuries or old age.

The Master was originally played by Roger Delgado from 1971 until his death in 1973. The role was subsequently played by Peter Pratt, Geoffrey Beevers, and Anthony Ainley, with Ainley reprising the role regularly through the 1980s until the series’s cancellation in 1989. Eric Roberts took on the role for the 1996 Doctor Who TV film. Since the show's revival in 2005, the Master has been portrayed by Derek Jacobi, John Simm, Michelle Gomez, and Sacha Dhawan.

Beevers, Roberts, Jacobi, Simm, Gomez, and Dhawan have reprised the role in audio dramas produced by Big Finish Productions, while Alex Macqueen, Gina McKee, Mark Gatiss, James Dreyfus, and Milo Parker have portrayed incarnations unique to Big Finish.

== Origins ==
The creative team conceived of the Master as a recurring villain, first appearing in Terror of the Autons (1971). The Master's title was deliberately chosen by producer Barry Letts and script editor Terrance Dicks because, like the Doctor, it was a title conferred by an academic degree. A sketch of three "new characters" for 1971 (the other two being Jo Grant and Mike Yates) suggested he was conceived to be of "equal, perhaps even superior rank, to the Doctor."

Letts only had one man in mind for the role: Roger Delgado, who had a long history of playing villains and had already made three attempts to be cast in the series. He had worked previously with Letts and was a good friend of Jon Pertwee.

Malcolm Hulke spoke of the character and his relationship with the Doctor: "There was a peculiar relationship between the Master and the Doctor: one felt that the Master wouldn't really have liked to eliminate the Doctor...you see the Doctor was the only person like him at the time in the whole universe, a renegade Time Lord and in a funny sort of way they were partners in crime."

An unrelated character also known as the Master, who ruled over the Land of Fiction, had previously appeared in the 1968 serial The Mind Robber opposite the Second Doctor.

== Aims and character ==
A would-be universal conqueror, the Master wants to control the universe. In The Deadly Assassin (1976), his ambitions are described as becoming "the master of all matter". He also had a secondary objective: to make the Doctor suffer. In The Sea Devils (1972), the Master mentions that the "pleasure" of seeing the destruction of the human race, of which the Doctor is fond, would be "a reward in itself."

== History within the show ==
=== Encounters with the Third Doctor ===
The Master, as played by Roger Delgado, makes his first appearance in Terror of the Autons (1971), where he allies with the Nestene Consciousness to help them invade Earth. The Third Doctor (Jon Pertwee) convinces the Master to stop this plan at the last minute, and the Master subsequently escapes, albeit with his TARDIS left non-functioning after the Doctor confiscates the ship's dematerialisation circuit.

Having become a main character in the show's eighth season, the Master reappears in The Mind of Evil, where he regains his TARDIS's circuit from the Doctor after attempting to launch a nerve gas missile that would initiate World War III. The Master is seen again in another incursion on Earth in The Claws of Axos, and then fails to hold the galaxy to ransom using a doomsday weapon on the planet Uxarieus in the year 2472 in Colony in Space. In The Dæmons, The Master is finally captured on Earth by the organization UNIT after Jo Grant (Katy Manning) prevents the alien Azal (Stephen Thorne) from giving The Master his powers.

In The Sea Devils (1972), the Master is shown to be imprisoned on an island off the coast of England. He convinces the governor of the prison, Colonel Trenchard (Clive Morton), to help him steal electronics from HMS Seaspite, the nearby naval base. This allows the Master to contact the reptilian Sea Devils, the former rulers of Earth, so he can help them retake the planet from humanity. The Master convinces the Doctor to help him build machinery that would bring the Sea Devils out of their millions of years of hibernation. Still, the Doctor sabotages the device by overloading it, destroying the Sea Devil base, and preventing war between humanity and reptiles. The Master subsequently escapes in a hovercraft. The Doctor reveals in this serial that the Master was once a "very good friend" of his.

Delgado's last appearance as the Master is in Frontier in Space (1973), where he works alongside the Dalek and Ogron races to provoke a war between the Human and Draconian Empires. The scheme fails, and the Master escapes after he shoots at the Doctor.

Delgado was slated to return in a serial called The Final Game, which would have been the season 11 finale. However, he died in a car crash in June 1973, and the story was never produced.

=== A new regeneration cycle — the long-serving Master ===
Played by Peter Pratt in his next appearance, the Master returns in The Deadly Assassin (1976), opposite the Fourth Doctor (Tom Baker). Special effects makeup was applied to Pratt to give the Master a corpse-like appearance. Found by Chancellor Goth (Bernard Horsfall) on the planet Tersurus, the Master is revealed to be in his final regeneration and near the end of his final life. The Master attempts to gain a new regeneration cycle by using the artefacts of Rassilon, the symbols of the President of the Council of Time Lords, to manipulate the Eye of Harmony at the cost of Gallifrey. However, the Doctor stops the Master, who escapes after his assumed death.

The Master later returns in The Keeper of Traken, the role taken over by Geoffrey Beevers. Still dying, the Master came to the Traken Union to renew his life by using the empire's technological Source. Though the plot fails, the Master manages to cheat death by transferring his essence into the body of a Traken scientist named Tremas (Anthony Ainley) and overwriting his host's mind.

The Master (Ainley, in a total of 31 episodes as the character) confronted the next three regenerations of the Doctor on and off for the rest of the classic series, still seeking to extend his life – preferably with a new set of regenerations. Subsequently, in "The Five Doctors" (1983), the Time Lords offer the Master a new regeneration cycle in exchange for his help, though the promise was not fulfilled at the time.

The Master's final appearance in the classic series is in Survival (1989, the final story of the series' original 26-year run), trapped on the planet of the Cheetah People and under its influence, which drives its victims to savagery. Though the Master manages to escape the doomed planet, he ends up back on the planet prior to its destruction when he attempts to kill the Seventh Doctor (Sylvester McCoy).

=== Dalek trial and 'execution' ===
The Master was the primary antagonist of the 1996 Doctor Who television film. He was played by American actor Eric Roberts.

In the prologue, the Master (portrayed briefly by Gordon Tipple) is executed by the Daleks as a punishment for his "evil crimes". But before his apparent death, the Master requests his remains to be brought back to Gallifrey by the Seventh Doctor. However, as posited in the novelisation of the film by Gary Russell, the Master's self-alterations to extend his lifespan allow him to survive his execution by transferring his mind into a snake-like entity called a "morphant." This interpretation is made explicit in the first of the Eighth Doctor Adventures novels, The Eight Doctors by Terrance Dicks, and also used in the Doctor Who Magazine comic strip story The Fallen, which states that the morphant was a shape-shifting animal native to Skaro.

Using his morphant body to break free from the container holding his remains, the Master sabotages the Doctor's TARDIS console to force it to crash land in San Francisco in December 1999. From there, the Master, as the morphant, enters the body of a paramedic named Bruce to take control of him. However, the Master finds his human host to be unsustainable as the body slowly begins to degenerate, although the Master has the added abilities to spit an acid-like bile, both as a weapon and to mentally control victims as an alternative to his usual hypnotic abilities. The Master attempts to access the Eye of Harmony to steal the remaining regenerations of the Eighth Doctor (Paul McGann), but instead is sucked into it and supposedly killed.

=== Professor Yana and Harold Saxon ===
In "Utopia", the Doctor encounters a scientist called Professor Yana (Derek Jacobi) at the end of the universe. Overhearing the Doctor discussing time travel and regeneration, he is prompted to open his pocket watch, revealing Yana to be The Master and the watch a repository of his Time Lord consciousness. The Master had used a chameleon arch - Gallifreyan technology used to turn a Time Lord into a human and storing the subject's memories in a fob watch - to escape detection after fleeing the Time War. His memory restored, the Master is shot by his former assistant Chantho (Chipo Chung) and regenerates into his next incarnation (John Simm) before stealing the Doctor's TARDIS and leaving him to die.

In "The Sound of Drums," the Doctor makes his way back to Earth to find the Master has become Prime Minister of the UK under the alias of Harold Saxon. The Master kidnaps Martha's family and conquers Earth.

In "Last of the Time Lords", Martha spends a year working to save her family and to thwart the Master's plan to wage war against the universe. The Master himself mentions that looking into the vortex as a child made "the drumming" choose him as a "call to war" in his head. When fatally shot by his human wife, Lucy Saxon (Alexandra Moen), the Master refuses to regenerate, knowing it will haunt the Doctor.

The Master returns in "The End of Time" (2009–2010) when his disciples attempt a resurrection ritual using a surviving piece of the Master's body. However, Lucy sabotages the ritual, bringing the Master back as an unstable creature, hungry for human flesh and leaking electrical energy. The Master proceeds with a plot to transform the entire human race into his own clones. The Master is sent back to Gallifrey when the Time Lords are sealed away in the Time War, trapped once more.

=== Missy ===
The Master influences the Doctor's life in the seventh series episode "The Bells of Saint John", when an unseen "woman in the shop" gives Clara Oswald the phone number to the TARDIS, initiating Clara's time as a companion. Independent of any connection to the "woman in the shop", an unidentified woman (Michelle Gomez) appears briefly in the eighth series episodes "Deep Breath" and “Into the Dalek”, welcoming a character to the afterlife. This mystery woman, and the fact that she is the "woman in the shop", is not revealed to be the Doctor's childhood friend until "Dark Water", when she formally introduces herself to the Doctor as a new female incarnation called "Missy", which is short for "Mistress". She reveals that she has created an "afterlife" from a Gallifreyan Matrix Data Slice, which stores the consciousness of dead people so they can eventually be made into Cybermen.

In "Death in Heaven", Missy offers the Doctor control of her Cybermen army in the hopes of compromising his morality. She is defeated when her Cyber army is destroyed, and appears vaporised when shot by the posthumously cyber-converted Brigadier Lethbridge-Stewart. Missy returns in "The Magician's Apprentice"/"The Witch's Familiar" (2015), revealed to have faked her demise using a teleporter powered by the energy of the Cyberman laser weapon that shot her.

In the tenth series episode "Extremis", it is revealed that the Doctor is keeping Missy in the well appointed Vault, having spared her from execution but vowing to keep her locked away for one thousand years. In "The Lie of the Land", the Doctor's crew visits Missy in the Vault to gain intelligence on the Monks. Her demeanour seems little changed, and she has low regard for human life, but in the episode's coda, she sheds remorseful tears for all the millions of deaths she has caused. In "Empress of Mars," she returns the Doctor's TARDIS to Mars to rescue the Doctor and Bill. In "The Eaters of Light," she has been released from her cage by the Doctor to run repairs on his TARDIS, which is isomorphically locked so that she cannot pilot it.

The Doctor attempts to test Missy's reformation in the tenth series finale "World Enough and Time"/"The Doctor Falls" by sending Missy, Bill, and Nardole (Matt Lucas) on a rescue mission aboard a spaceship experiencing time dilation near a black hole. However, the Master (John Simm) is aboard the ship and has initiated the Cybermen's genesis. Missy's loyalties are torn between the Doctor and her old self. After initially betraying the Doctor, she later stands alongside him against a Cyberman army, stabbing her past self causing the Master to regenerate. Enraged at Missy becoming the Doctor's ally, the Master shoots Missy with his laser screwdriver, ostensibly disabling her ability to regenerate and killing her.

=== Spy Master and Grigori Rasputin ===
During "Spyfall" the Thirteenth Doctor seeks out a former MI6 agent known as 'O' (Sacha Dhawan) who reveals himself as a new incarnation of the Master during the cliffhanger, having killed the real O by shrinking O's body into a tiny corpse, he assumed his identity. In "The Timeless Children", the Master takes the Doctor into the ruins of Gallifrey, and reveals how the Time Lords secretly acquired the power to regenerate by harvesting the DNA of the Timeless Child, who is revealed to be the Doctor, who lived throughout Gallifrey's civilisation and had her memory wiped on at least one occasion.

The Master attempts to kill the Lone Cyberman and persuades the Cyberium, an AI containing all Cyberman knowledge and history, to use his body as a host. Using the Cyberium, the Master creates a new Cyberman race with regenerative abilities from dead Time Lords. The Doctor fails to defeat the Master using the "Death Particle", which can destroy all organic life on a planet. Ko Sharmus, the Boundary guardian, blames himself for the new Cyberman race as he was responsible for hiding the Cyberium and failed. As the Doctor escapes, Ko Sharmus sacrifices himself by detonating the Death Particle, ostensibly killing the Master and his army of Cyber Masters.

After a hint in "The Vanquishers" (2021), Dhawan's Master returned in "The Power of the Doctor" (2022), Jodie Whittaker's final episode as the Thirteenth Doctor. In the episode, the Master, having survived the Death Particle, becomes Grigori Rasputin in 1916 Russia and allies with his Cybermasters and the Daleks. After baiting UNIT by defacing famous paintings, he and his allies capture the Doctor, whom he takes back to 1916. He reveals his plan to turn the Earth into a foundry for the Cybermen and Daleks, and uses the energy of a captured being called a Qurunx to forcibly regenerate the Doctor into him.

The Master, now possessing the Doctor's body and TARDIS, intends to tarnish her name by using it as a force for terror, and begins to enact his plan. However, companion Yasmin "Yaz" Khan shoves him out of the TARDIS, and uses a failsafe holographic AI of the Doctor to help former companions Tegan Jovanka and Ace stop the Cybermen and the Daleks while she recaptures the Master, using the Master's own equipment and the energies of the Time Lord/Cyberman hybrids to reverse the regeneration, returning the Doctor to her thirteenth body. After the restored Doctor and her various allies stop the Cybermen and Daleks, she frees the Qurunx and has it destroy the Master's planet with an energy beam. In his weakened, original body, the Master aims the beam at the Doctor (triggering her next regeneration) before collapsing near his own TARDIS. Yaz manages to rescue the Doctor, but the Master is left behind on the imploding planet, seemingly perishing along with it.

=== Trapped by the Toymaker ===
In the 2023 special "The Giggle," the Toymaker tells the Fourteenth Doctor that the Master is one of several beings that he has won games against. The Toymaker reveals that having won a game against the Master as he was "begging for his life", he had trapped him inside a golden tooth for all eternity. Later, when the Fourteenth and Fifteenth Doctors banish the Toymaker from existence, the tooth is left on the floor and picked up by someone unknown.

== Characteristics ==
=== Intelligence and attitude ===
The Master and the Doctor are shown to have similar levels of intelligence, and were classmates at the Time Lord Academy on Gallifrey, where the Master outperformed the Doctor. A similar connection between the two was also referenced in "The End of Time" in which the Master reminisces with the Tenth Doctor about his father's estates on Gallifrey and his childhood with the Doctor before saying "look at us now". In the 2007 episode "Utopia", the Tenth Doctor calls the transformed and disguised Master a genius and shows admiration for his intellect before discovering his true identity. The Tenth Doctor further expresses admiration for the Master's intellect in "The End of Time" by calling him "stone cold brilliant" and yet states that the Master could be more if he would just give up his desire for domination. The Twelfth Doctor states that Missy is "the one person almost as smart as me" ("The Lie of the Land").

Delgado's portrayal of the Master was that of a suave and charming psychopathic individual, able to be polite and murderous at almost the same time. His design is an homage to the classic Svengali character: a black Nehru outfit with a beard and moustache. This version of the Master, like his opponent the Third Doctor, possessed considerable fighting skills; at one point in the episode The Sea Devils, the Master and the Doctor engage in a swordfight. Also like the Doctor, the Master enjoyed using various scientific gadgets, devices, and weapons in his schemes, with the most prominent being a weapon called the Tissue Compression Eliminator (or TCE for short), that kills anyone it's used on by compressing their body to the size of a toy doll. In The Mind of Evil, he not only creates the "Keller machine" to drain evil impulses from the minds of anyone subjected to it, but also makes use of a mind control device (that can also be used to amplify the effects of the Keller machine, as he demonstrates on the Doctor).

In the portrayals of the Master on his last regeneration (first by Peter Pratt in The Deadly Assassin, then by Geoffrey Beevers in The Keeper of Traken), he is shown to still retain his scientific intelligence and deviousness despite being in an extreme state of physical decay. However, the trauma his body has been put through has driven him insane as he obsessively attempts to find a way to obtain a new cycle of regenerations without regard to what the cost might be.

When Anthony Ainley takes over as the Master (in The Keeper of Traken, the Master possesses the body of the noble Tremas, who was played by Ainley throughout the story), his portrayal showed the Master as almost singularly obsessed with humiliating and destroying the Doctor; while possessing the same level of intelligence and cunning that his previous incarnations had, the Ainley version of the character often had a much shorter temper, flying into a rage more often than the cool, suave version that Delgado portrayed. Ainley's Master was also much more outwardly villainous, at times murdering people (usually with his familiar TCE) not because they jeopardized his schemes, but simply because he enjoyed killing (often accompanying these deaths with his trademark sinister low and throaty chuckle). Nearly all of the schemes of this particular incarnation revolve around setting a trap to lure the Doctor into; as an example, near the beginning of The Mark of the Rani, the Master is shown to be hiding out in a field disguised as a scarecrow, for no apparent reason other than to wait for the Doctor to show up. During the same story, the Rani (a fellow villainous Time Lord that the Master strongarms into assisting him) remarked that the Master would "get dizzy if he tried to walk in a straight line", a reference to the Master's often convoluted and complicated schemes he devised in order to trap the Doctor. Ainley's portrayal of the Master is notable for being the only incarnation of the character to have met and interacted with every one of the Doctor's incarnations during the show's run in the 1980s, having met the First, Second and Third Doctors during "The Five Doctors", as well as being one of the primary antagonists of the Fifth Doctor throughout his run (starting with Castrovalva and last encountering him in Planet of Fire), and having encountered the Fourth Doctor (Logopolis), Sixth Doctor (The Mark of the Rani, as well as turning up during the events of The Trial of a Time Lord), and Seventh Doctor (Survival, which was the final time Ainley played the Master during the original series' run, as well as the final story of the original series overall).

Though only appearing onscreen as the Master for a brief time during the events of "Utopia", Derek Jacobi's portrayal of the Master shows him as still possessing the evil nature of his predecessors (just prior to opening the fob watch that was secretly his biodata module, the Master heard voices of his past selves, including dialogue from Roger Delgado as well as Anthony Ainley's sinister chuckle). Transformed from the kindly Professor Yana after opening the fob watch, the Master rages at Chantho for not ever asking him about his fob watch, angrily blaming her for leaving him trapped in his secret identity; wielding a high voltage electric cable, the Master tells Chantho who he really is just before murdering her. Even after being shot by the dying Chantho, the Master snarls that he was killed by "an insect...a girl" before deciding to regenerate into a "young and strong" body like that of the Doctor's.

Aspects of Simm's portrayal of the Master parallel David Tennant's Doctor, primarily in his ability to make light of tense situations and his rather quirky and hyperactive personality. According to the producers, this was done to make the Master more threatening to the Doctor by having him take one of his opponent's greatest strengths, as well as making the parallels between the two characters more distinctive. This rationale is written into dialogue by the Master in "Utopia," in which he explicitly states, as he is regenerating, that if the Doctor can be young and strong, then so can he.

Michelle Gomez maintained Simm's portrayal of the character, specifically the psychopathic behaviour and inappropriate emotional responses to certain situations. She also portrayed the original traditions of ruthless, murderous behaviour and grandiose, Machiavellian criminal intelligence that have been consistent throughout all incarnations. However, she also displayed a much more coquettish manner, with her new female identity allowing her to fully express aspects of the Master's ambiguous bond with the Doctor (as previously explored by Simm's incarnation in "The Sound of Drums"). While determined to torment and corrupt the Doctor with moral temptation while inflicting pain and death to humanity, she frequently referred to him as her "boyfriend" or "friend" and appeared to desire his acquiescence and company ultimately. She is also well aware that she is even more dangerously psychopathic than before, describing herself as "bananas" to UNIT agent Osgood right before killing her ("Death in Heaven"). However, when circumstances result in Missy being kept in a vault and monitored by the Doctor after an averted execution, Missy actually comes to show signs of remorse for what she had done in the past, to the point that she prepares to side with the Doctor over her own past incarnation ("The Doctor Falls").

Dhawan's Master returns to the Master's love of evil for the sake of being evil, proclaiming at one point that he kills because he's good at it and asking why he should ever stop. Where Missy's actions were based around a twisted attraction to the Doctor, Dhawan's Master destroys Gallifrey simply because he cannot bring himself to accept a discovery that suggests Time Lord society owes regeneration and other secrets of its past to the child that became the Doctor. He perceives this as creating a twisted link between the Doctor and himself.

=== Mental abilities ===
Both the Doctor and the Master have been shown to be skilled hypnotists, although the Master's capacity to dominate—even by stare and voice alone—has been shown to be far more pronounced. In Logopolis, the Doctor said of the Master, "He's a Time Lord. In many ways, we have the same mind." The Master is often able to anticipate the Doctor's moves, as seen in stories such as Castrovalva, The Keeper of Traken, Time-Flight, and The King's Demons, where he plans elaborate traps for the Doctor, only revealing his presence at the key moment. In The Deadly Assassin, the Master was able to send a false premonition as a telepathic message to the Doctor, but it is unclear whether he performed this through innate psychic ability, or was aided technologically.

In "The End of Time," the Master uses a kind of psychic technique, previously used by the Doctor to read the minds of others, allowing the Doctor to hear the constant 'drumming' inside the Master's mind.

=== TARDIS ===
In the original series, the Master's TARDISes have had fully functioning chameleon circuits, having appeared as various things, including a horsebox, a spaceship, a fir tree, a computer bank, a grandfather clock, a fluted architectural column, an iron maiden, a fireplace, a British Airways jet, a cottage and a triangular column. Of the Master's TARDISes seen in The Keeper of Traken, one appears as the calcified, statue-like Melkur, able to move and even walk; the other appears as a grandfather clock. The Melkur TARDIS is destroyed. At one point in Logopolis, the Master's TARDIS even appears as a police box, like the Doctor's.

Missy uses a vortex manipulator rather than a TARDIS in series nine. She used a pair of them which were linked to one another, to transport herself and Clara Oswald to the Doctor's 'farewell party' in medieval Essex ("The Magician's Apprentice"). They are destroyed in "The Witch's Familiar" when, to avoid being killed by Daleks, they channel energy from the Daleks' weapons to teleport them away, looking as if they were exterminated.

In The Doctor Falls, the Master acquired a TARDIS before leaving Gallifrey but burnt out its dematerialisation circuit while attempting to get away from a black hole too fast. His future incarnation Missy provides him with a spare, and the Master can fix his TARDIS and depart.

In "Spyfall, Part 1", the disguised Master lives in an outback shack which he later reveals to be his TARDIS. In Part 2, he is shown flying this TARDIS to London in 1834 and Paris in 1943. The Thirteenth Doctor later steals it from him to return to the present after being trapped in the past without her TARDIS. This is the first time since the show's revival that the Master's TARDIS interior is shown on screen and is noted to be the same size on the inside.

=== Handheld weaponry ===
The Master's weapon of choice in the original show's run was the "tissue compression eliminator," which shrinks its target to doll-like proportions, killing them in the process. Its appearance is similar to that of the Doctor's tool, the sonic screwdriver.

John Simm's incarnation of The Master with his laser screwdriver, as seen in the 2007 episode "The Sound of Drums".

Despite his own fondness for the weapon, Russell T Davies decided against bringing it back for the Master's reappearance in "The Sound of Drums" because the Master had too many new "tricks" to use against the Doctor.

During the course of "The Sound of Drums," the Master unveils a new handheld weapon: a laser screwdriver. The device functions as a powerful laser weapon, capable of killing with a single shot. It also carries the ability to age victims rapidly using a miniaturised version of the genetic manipulator developed by Professor Lazarus ("The Lazarus Experiment"). The screwdriver is biometrically secured so that only the Master can use it. In "The Doctor Falls," the Master uses a laser screwdriver again to battle the Cybermen. After being stabbed by Missy, the Master shoots her with the laser screwdriver at "full blast," which he said would prevent her regeneration and kill her permanently.

In "Dark Water"/"Death in Heaven," Missy uses a small hand-held device, about the size of a large mobile phone, which allows her to control her technology and scan her surroundings remotely. It also contains a weapon that she uses to disintegrate Dr. Chang, Osgood, and Seb. In "The Magician's Apprentice," Missy uses a newer, upgraded version of this device which appears to be more powerful. It allowed her to control airborne planes after she had frozen them in time and simultaneously disintegrate several UNIT guards.

Missy's parasol is revealed to be a disguised sonic/laser device in "The Doctor Falls." She uses it to defend against an attacking Cyberman. A more unusual feature, demonstrated in "Death in Heaven," allows her to travel through the air like Mary Poppins.

Missy says her brooch contains a Gallifreyan Dark Star alloy pin, given to her by the Doctor which she uses to pierce a Dalek's armoured shell. In "The Doctor Falls," Missy uses a small blade concealed in her sleeve to stab her own past self, triggering his off-screen regeneration.

In "Spyfall," the Tissue Compression Eliminator returns as the Master, having regained his manic state, reveals he used it to steal the identity of an ally of the Doctor. He also used it to bring the Doctor to his mercy by threatening to use it on people in 1834. In "The Timeless Children," the Master threatens the Doctor's human friends with it to get her to return to Gallifrey with him and later kills Ashad, the Lone Cyberman, with the Tissue Compression Eliminator. The Master used it again in "The Power of the Doctor," revealing that the Tissue Compression Eliminator could work in reverse and unleashing a Cyberman army, including Ashad, encapsulated in a single miniaturised Cyberman.

== In other media ==
The Master has featured in numerous Doctor Who spin-offs. One of the most notable of these other appearances is David A. McIntee's "Master trilogy" of novels comprising The Dark Path and First Frontier in the Virgin Publishing lines and The Face of the Enemy for BBC Books, and the Doctor Who audio dramas produced by Big Finish Productions, in which various actors have reprised the role from the TV series or played original versions of the Master.

=== Novels ===
The Master's past with the Doctor is explored in The Dark Path, which reveals that his name before taking the alias of the Master is Koschei, when he encounters the Second Doctor during their travels. Although initially a somewhat anti-heroic version of the Doctor, willing to murder to save the day but generally still trying to do the right, Koschei turns to evil and becomes the Master after he discovers that his companion and lover Ailla is an undercover agent of the Celestial Intervention Agency sent to spy on him. During the course of the novel, Ailla is shot and killed. Koschei, not knowing that she is a Time Lord and will simply regenerate, completes a time-based weapon to benefit the anti-alien efforts of soldiers from Earth's Empire in an attempt to bring her back. The weapon is used to destroy the planet Teriliptus and its inhabitants. When Ailla turns up alive, the knowledge that he has destroyed a planet for nothing, coupled with the revelation of Ailla's betrayal, proves too much. Koschei resolves to bring his own order to the universe at the expense of free will and becoming its Master. Thanks to the Doctor reprogramming his weapon, Koschei is trapped in a black hole at the end of the novel, with it being left uncertain how he will escape. The cover art of The Dark Path depicts Koschei as being already the same regeneration as the Delgado-era Master.

The Face of the Enemy centres around the Delgado-era Master, but includes a cameo by a Koschei from an alternate timeline (specifically, the timeline the Third Doctor visited in Inferno) who never became the Master. This version of Koschei is a loyal Time Lord who was stranded on the alternate Earth after that universe's version of The Web of Fear destroyed his TARDIS. He is subsequently captured and forced to work for the fascist rulers, who keep him alive in agony using life support systems. When the Master, crossing over from the other universe, learns of this, he ends his counterpart's life in a rare moment of compassion.

Last of the Gaderene by Mark Gatiss and Deadly Reunion by Terrance Dicks and Barry Letts are both close homages to the Delgado/Pertwee stories. In Last of the Gaderene, the Master, disguised as Police Inspector Lemaitre, assists an alien race called the Gaderene to invade Earth, starting with a small village. In Deadly Reunion, he attempts to control powerful forces through a cult, but finds himself at the mercy of a godlike alien. The Delgado Master also appears in Verdigris by Paul Magrs, a more parodic take on the Pertwee era. The eponymous genie spends much of the novel impersonating the Master, who is in fact controlling him: the real Master appears in the novel's epilogue, buying a Chinese takeaway.

The reason the Master is so emaciated when he appears in The Deadly Assassin is explored in John Peel's novel Legacy of the Daleks, in which he attempts to capture the Doctor's granddaughter Susan Foreman, resulting in an out-of-sequence encounter with the Eighth Doctor when the Doctor receives a telepathic cry of distress from Susan and attempts to trace it back to before its origin. The Master is badly burned when she attacks him in self-defence and takes possession of his TARDIS. After Susan escapes, the dying Master is eventually found by Chancellor Goth on the planet Tersurus, which leads directly into the events of The Deadly Assassin.

The Ainley-era Master appears in the novel The Quantum Archangel by Craig Hinton, a direct sequel to The Time Monster. In this novel, he poses as a Serbian businessman called Gospodar (prompting the Sixth Doctor to wonder if he's "running out of languages") while attempting to subvert the power of the higher dimensions to turn himself into a god. However, it to be revealed that this plan was actually the result of the machinations of the Chronovore/Eternal hybrid Kronos trying to trick the Master into punishing the Chronovores for his lifetime of imprisonment, with one of the Master's pawns being transformed into the titular Quantum Archangel when she absorbs the higher-dimensional energy as the Master tests his equipment. As the novel concludes, the Master briefly regresses to his crippled and burned form while the Doctor absorbs more of the excess energy to delay the Quantum Archangel on her level, but the story ends with the Master having restored himself to physical health with a boost of the last dregs of higher-dimensional power (although he is apparently subsequently attacked by a group of chronovores).

First Frontier shows the Master (apparently the Ainley version) finally acquiring a new body, who according to McIntee is based on the cinema persona of Basil Rathbone, using nanites provided by the alien race known as the Tzun in exchange for his help in setting up their 'invasion' of Earth. This incarnation reappears in Happy Endings by Paul Cornell, Virgin Publishing's celebratory fiftieth Virgin New Adventures novel, once again trying to restore his ability to regenerate, suggesting that the Tzun nanites failed to sustain him long-term.

Before the end of the Virgin Missing Adventures series, the Delgado version of the Master appears in the novel Who Killed Kennedy, depicting him setting up a complex plan to manipulate a journalist to bother UNIT by convincing him that they are part of a corrupt conspiracy. The novel, while published by Virgin, was not considered part of the Missing Adventures series.

Another version of the Master appears in The Infinity Doctors (also by Parkin), where he is known as the Magistrate and is, once again, the Doctor's friend, although when this takes place in continuity is unclear. Parkin has stated that the novel can fit into continuity and that its incarnation of the Master is based on Richard E. Grant.

During the Faction Paradox arc that runs through the Eighth Doctor Adventures, a character known as the War King is featured, which is implied to be a future incarnation of the Master. The character is also referenced in The Book of the War, published by Mad Norwegian Press when the Faction Paradox stories spun off into their own continuity. Later Faction Paradox stories confirm the Magistrate is the younger version of the War King, which had been implied in The Taking of Planet 5.

Alastair Reynolds' novel Harvest of Time, published in 2013, features the Roger Delgado incarnation, set after his capture at the end of The Dæmons and before he escapes from prison in The Sea Devils. In the course of the novel, the Master is nearly erased from history by an ancient race known as the Sild, who have captured multiple incarnations of the Master to create a complex temporal manipulator by linking the Masters in a neural network, but the Doctor and the Master track the Sild to their origin, allowing the Master to take control of the Sild's network and turn it against them before his other selves rebel against his control, forcing him to allow the other Masters to escape.

=== Comic strips ===
The Doctor Who Magazine (DWM) 1992 Winter Special comic Flashback shows a young Master (here called "Magnus") and Doctor on Gallifrey. The Master plans to use a living entity to harness Arton Energy, only for the Doctor to thwart his plans.

The Master returns in a new body and guise, that of a street preacher, in the previously mentioned the DWM comic strip story The Fallen, although the Doctor does not recognise him. The Master reveals himself a few stories later, in The Glorious Dead. The Master had survived the events of the television movie by encountering a cosmic being named Esterath in the time vortex. Esterath controls the Glory, the focal point of the Omniversal spectrum which underlies all existence. The Master's scheme to take control of the Glory fails, and he is banished to parts unknown (see Kroton).

In Character Assassin in DWM No. 311, the Delgado Master visits the Land of Fiction and steals part of the technology behind it, wiping out several nineteenth century fictional villains as he goes. He can also be seen in the following comic strips set during the Pertwee era:

- "The Glen of Sleeping" by Gerry Haylock and Dick O'Neill (TV Action 107–111)
- "Fogbound" by Frank Langford (Doctor Who Holiday Special 1973)
- "The Time Thief" by Steve Livesey (Doctor Who Annual 1974)
- "The Man in the Ion Mask" by Brian Williamson and Dan Abnett (Doctor Who Magazine Winter Special 1991)

In the IDW publication Prisoners of Time, a 12-issue series to celebrate the 50th anniversary of Doctor Who, the Master (drawn based on Ainley's portrayal) plays a major part. He is the villain in issues 6 and 7, attempting to trap the Sixth Doctor in an Auton-staffed asylum and encountering the Seventh as he attempts to drain the energy from a pair of higher-dimensional beings. The Ainley Master is revealed to have teamed up with the Ninth Doctor's disgraced ex-companion Adam Mitchell, who is traveling through time kidnapping the Doctor's companions as revenge, the Master having presented himself as another 'victim' of the Doctor rather than the villain he truly is. His role in the plan after Adam abducts Clara Oswald culminates in an out-of-sequence encounter with the Eleventh Doctor, the Doctor observing that it has been a pleasantly long time since he saw this version of the Master. However, when the Eleventh Doctor manages to summon his previous ten selves to Adam's fortress to rescue their companions when Adam threatens to kill them all, the Master reveals that his true plan is to channel his stolen chronal energies through the Doctors' combined TARDISes, thus destroying the Universe. Horrified at the Master's evil scale and encouraged to take action by Rose and the Ninth, Tenth, and Eleventh Doctors, Adam stands up to the Master, sacrificing himself to disable the Master's equipment. The Master escapes, noting that he enjoyed the chance to cause further chaos, but his plan has been thwarted. This is the only story in any medium as of April 2015 in which the Ninth and Eleventh Doctors encounter the Master.

2017 sees the return of Delgado's incarnation in Doorway to Hell, a Doctor Who Magazine comic strip printed in DWM #508–511, set after the events of Frontier in Space from the Master's perspective. (Note: In part three, the Master mentions returning to Earth after the Doctor and the Master's "affair with the Daleks and Draconians".) This depicts an out-of-sequence encounter between Delgado's Master and the Twelfth Doctor in the year 1973, with the Master initially assuming that the Twelfth Doctor is the Fourth who regenerated after an explosion in the TARDIS that left the Doctor trapped on Earth in this time, until the Doctor informs his foe that he is from far in the Master's future. At the story's conclusion the critically wounded Master regenerates inside his TARDIS after the Doctor and the human family he has been living with deflects an attack with the "artron energy" the family absorbed while the Doctor's TARDIS was healing in their garden.

Titan Comics published a series of comics which included a Master who was a contemporary of the War Doctor. This Master has the appearance of a young boy. In his final appearance, he regenerated into the Derek Jacobi incarnation seen in "Utopia".

=== Audio plays ===
The Master has made regular appearances in various audio plays produced by Big Finish. Geoffrey Beevers, Derek Jacobi, Michelle Gomez, Eric Roberts, John Simm and Sacha Dhawan have all reprised the role from the television series, while Mark Gatiss, Alex Macqueen, Gina McKee, James Dreyfus and Milo Parker portray versions of the Master original to Big Finish. Jon Culshaw has performed as the Roger Delgado and Anthony Ainley incarnations of the Master.

The Master's first audio appearance came in 2001 for the monthly range story Dust Breeding, where Geoffrey Beevers reprises the role for the first time since 1981. At some point after Survival, the Master's Trakenite body is damaged and he returns to his walking corpse state once again. Narratively, most audio appearances by Beevers as The Master take place after this story (with the exception of The Fourth Doctor Adventures), as this incarnation becomes the default form the Master reverts to once inhabited bodies (such as the Ainley and Roberts versions) are destroyed.

In Master, the origin of the Master and the Doctor's enmity is explored with flashbacks to their shared childhood and an ongoing plot involving the Seventh Doctor (Sylvester McCoy) attempting to reconcile with his old nemesis.

==== Unbound ====
As part of the Doctor Who Unbound range, an alternative-universe Master voiced by Mark Gatiss appears in the Big Finish audio play Sympathy for the Devil opposite an alternative Third Doctor played by David Warner. Gatiss' version of the Master later appears in Big Finish's The New Adventures of Bernice Summerfield range when Bernice Summerfield is temporarily pulled into the Unbound universe. He later escapes to Benny's universe and makes a guest appearance in The War Master series.

Another alternative version of the Master, played by Beevers, appears alongside an alternative Doctor played by Colin Baker in the Doctor Who Unbound duology Doctor of War.

==== The Fourth Doctor Adventures ====
Beevers also made appearances as the Master in several releases in The Fourth Doctor Adventures range, reuniting with Tom Baker as the Fourth Doctor, between May 2012 and April 2015.

==== The Eighth Doctor Adventures ====
Alex Macqueen plays a new incarnation of the Master in the Seventh Doctor release UNIT: Dominion masquerading as a future version of the Doctor before his true identity is revealed. He goes on to become a recurring antagonist in the Eighth Doctor's Dark Eyes series where it is explained that the Time Lords resurrected the Master to fight in an approaching conflict, implied to be the Time War. The events surrounding the Master's resurrection were depicted in the Ravenous series five years later.

Beevers, Jacobi, Roberts, and Gomez appeared in the fourth volume of the Eighth Doctor series Ravenous in October 2019. In Planet of Dust, the Doctor and his companions encounter the Burnt Master (Beevers) on the planet Parrak, who reveals he has once again returned to his emaciated corpse form following his time in the body of Bruce (Roberts) and is subsequently killed by the Ravenous.

In Day of the Master, the Eighth Doctor reunites with the Bruce Master, while his companions Liv Chenka and Helen Sinclair are confronted by the War Master (Jacobi) and Missy (Gomez) respectively. The Burnt Master is resurrected and granted a new regeneration cycle, with the implication that he regenerates into the Alex Macqueen incarnation.

==== The War Master ====
In December 2017, Derek Jacobi reprised his role as the Master for The War Master, an ongoing series of audios set during the Time War, having originally appeared in the 2007 episode "Utopia". The first series ends with the Master using a chameleon arch to turn himself into an infant human, setting up the events of "Utopia". Subsequent series occur earlier in the War Master's life and depict him getting involved with various battles in the Time War, sometimes at the behest of the Time Lords and sometimes for his own ends. Mark Gatiss made a guest appearance as the alternate-universe Master in series four. In the tenth volume—Rogue Encounters—Jacobi plays Professor Yana, the Master's human alter-ego seen in "Utopia".

Jacobi has also appeared as the War Master in several other Big Finish ranges, including UNIT: Cyber-Reality, the first volume of Gallifrey: Time War and the Dark Gallifrey series.

==== Missy ====
Like Jacobi, Michelle Gomez also performs her incarnation of the Master (renamed Missy) for an ongoing audio series. Missy premiered in February 2019 and featured The Monk played by Rufus Hound.

The second series introduces a character known as The Lumiat – revealed to be the next incarnation of The Master, the immediate successor to Missy – played by Gina McKee. It is explained that, after her "poetic" death at the hands of her predecessor, Missy used an Elysian field to rebuild her body at a cellular level, triggering a regeneration. Motivated by her recent attempt at redemption, she used the field to remove all negative aspects of her personality from her reconstructed body and became a benevolent force in the universe, adopting the title Lumiat. Missy encounters the Lumiat trying to undo some of her evil deeds.

In the third series, Gomez and Hound were joined by Gemma Whelan as the Meddling Nun – another incarnation of the Monk. A fourth volume was released in May 2024.

Gomez also returned for a story in Big Finish's The Eighth of March range, which saw Missy stranded in Earth's past and threatening a young Amy Pond (Caitlin Blackwood). Marking the 60th anniversary of Doctor Who, Gomez and McKee reprised their roles as Missy and The Lumiat respectively in separate stories of the Once and Future series. Gomez appears in The Martian Invasion of Planetoid 50 and McKee in Time Lord Immemorial.

==== Master! ====
Following his return in The Diary of River Song and Masterful, Roberts reprised his role as the Master again in March 2021 for a three-part special release entitled Master!, featuring Chase Masterson as Vienna Salvatore. Following the events of Ravenous, the Master is freed from the vortex by a scientist named Lila Kreeg (Laura Aikman). Masterson and Roberts returned for a second series—Nemesis Express—released in October 2022 and a third—Planet Doom—in February 2024.

==== Call Me Master ====
At Big Finish Day 2022, it was announced that Sacha Dhawan would reprise the role of The Master from the television series for a new audio series, Call Me Master. The first volume debuted in February 2025 with a second volume released in September 2025.

==== Anniversary Appearances ====
Beevers plays The Master as the main antagonist in The Light at the End, a special release celebrating Doctor Who's fiftieth anniversary.

To mark forty-five years since the Master's first appearance, Big Finish released a trilogy of stories featuring the Geoffrey Beevers and Alex Macqueen incarnations of the Master in 2016. And You Will Obey Me features the Beevers Master encountering the Fifth Doctor, while Vampire of the Mind pits the Sixth Doctor against Macqueen's Master. Both Masters come together in the final story of the trilogy – The Two Masters - opposite the Seventh Doctor.

In January 2021, to mark the fiftieth anniversary of the Master's first television appearance, Big Finish released Masterful, a three-part special written by James Goss uniting every living television and audio incarnation of the Master (other than Sacha Dhawan due to licensing). It saw John Simm reprise his role as the Harold Saxon version of the Master for the first time on audio and introduced Milo Parker as a young incarnation of the Master. Beevers, Gatiss, Jacobi, Macqueen, Roberts, and Gomez all reprised their roles. Gina McKee makes a cameo appearance as the Lumiat, Katy Manning appears as Jo Grant and Jon Culshaw voices Kamelion impersonating the Ainley Master. The special edition release included an original audiobook Terror of the Master written by Trevor Baxendale, narrated by Jon Culshaw and featuring the Delgado Master and the Third Doctor. This story was given a standalone re-release in March 2023.

==== Other appearances ====
The Companion Chronicles release, Mastermind explores how the Master survived his apparent demise in the 1996 television movie and regained access to his TARDIS, with Beevers playing The Master.

For the Lost Stories range, Big Finish adapted the cancelled season 23 television story The Hollows of Time. The Master was set to appear in the original television script, disguised as a character called Professor Stream. However, licensing restrictions prevented Big Finish from using the Master so the true identity of Professor Stream (played by David Garfield) was left ambiguous.

In May 2018, it was announced that the fifth series of The Diary of River Song would feature the title character, River Song, encountering four incarnations of the Master. As well as Beevers and Jacobi returning, this release saw Eric Roberts and Michelle Gomez make their Big Finish debuts as their incarnations of the Master.

As part of the Time Lord Victorious multi-platform storyline, a pair of Short Trips stories introduced the Roger Delgado and Anthony Ainley incarnations of the Master to Big Finish – Master Thief by Fio Trethewey and Lesser Evils by Simon Guerrier were released in October 2020 with Jon Culshaw serving as narrator and voicing both incarnations of the Master.

Chris Finney plays a character named Keith Potter in the story The End of the Line from the audio anthology The Sixth Doctor: The Last Adventure, later revealed to be an avatar under the control of the Master.

James Dreyfus portrays an early incarnation of the Master opposite David Bradley as the First Doctor in Doctor Who: The First Doctor Adventures. Dreyfus also appears in the Second Doctor audio The Home Guard, the Fourth Doctor audio Solo and the Seventh Doctor audio The Psychic Circus.

The Master, played again by Geoffrey Beevers, makes a cameo appearance in series 10 of the Doctor Who spin-off Jago & Litefoot, and later featured as the main villain for the eleventh series.

===== Dark Gallifrey =====
Premiering in April 2024, Big Finish's Dark Gallifrey series follows various Time Lord villains from the Doctor Who universe on missions to discover the fabled Dark Gallifrey, a corrupted version of the Time Lord home-world lost in the multiverse. Each three-part series in the range is centered around a different character and its second, third, fourth and sixth series star Derek Jacobi, Michelle Gomez, Eric Roberts and Geoffrey Beevers respectively as their incarnations of The Master.

=== Short stories ===
Eric Saward included Anthony Ainley's incarnation of the Master in his short story, "Birth of a Renegade," in the Doctor Who 20th Anniversary Special one-off magazine, published by Radio Times (and in the United States by Starlog Press) in 1983.

In "The Feast of the Stone," a short story by Cavan Scott and Mark Wright that follows on from the Scream of the Shalka, the story pivots around the nature of the android version of the Master, his reality as an extension of the reality of the TARDIS, and his relationship with the Doctor.

The Master is seen to escape the Eye of Harmony in the short story "Forgotten" by Joseph Lidster, published in Short Trips: The Centenarian. The story ends with him left in 1906 in possession of a human male's body.

Martha Jones' year long journey across a Master-controlled planet Earth is detailed in the short story collection The Story of Martha, which was released on 26 December 2008.

In the Doctor Who short eBook The Spear of Destiny by Marcus Sedgwick, featuring the Third Doctor, the Master disguises himself as a Viking called Frey (Old Norse for Master) and tries to take the Spear of Destiny.

=== Webcasts ===
In 2003, an android version of the character (resembling the Delgado version of the Master and voiced by Derek Jacobi) appeared in the animated webcast Scream of the Shalka. This version of the Master exists as a companion to the Doctor, albeit a slightly sinister one. Exactly why the Doctor created an android duplicate of the Master is not stated, but it is revealed the Master was faced with the choice of permanent death or one last chance at life on a leash to make amends for the harm he had caused over the years. This version's Master possesses weak psychic abilities, and is able to pilot the Doctor's TARDIS but physically unable to leave the ship.

To promote the audio series Master!, Eric Roberts reprised the role of the Master onscreen for the first time since 1996 in a series of video prequels posted to social media by Big Finish Productions; starting with a Halloween-themed video in November 2020 and subsequent Christmas and Valentine's Day messages. In the final message, the Master is heard calling out to "Lila", a character from the audio series that the Master manipulates into granting his freedom from the vortex.

=== Audio book ===
- The Killing Stone (BBV Audio, read by Richard Franklin)

=== Computer game ===
- Doctor Who: Destiny of the Doctors, played by Ainley. This was his last performance as the Master before his death.
- Lego Dimensions, featuring a Lego version of Missy voiced by Gomez.

=== Role playing game ===
The Doctor Who role-playing game published by FASA in 1985 has two modules outlining the Master's personal history, a timeline of his activities, and an inventory of much of the equipment he has obtained during his travels. Most notably, the modules identify the Meddling Monk as an alias the Master has used in his early attempts to alter the history of Earth.

=== Board game ===
The 1980 board game Doctor Who: The Game of Time & Space features information on the characters within the game. Of note, it states that "The Monk," The War Chief and the Master are all the same person.

=== Parody ===
In the 1999 Comic Relief sketch The Curse of Fatal Death, the Master was played by Jonathan Pryce.

=== Stage ===
Alex Macqueen appeared as The Master on stage for a live recording of the Big Finish audio play The Stuff of Legend, written by Robert Valentine. Four performances took place over Saturday 14th and Sunday 15 September 2024 at Cadogan Hall in London. A version of the story recorded in studio was released on the day of the first performance and a "live" version, combining recordings from all four performances, was released in December 2024.

== List of appearances ==
The actors who have played the role of the Master in the series and the dates of their first and last televised appearances in the role are:

Actor	No. of episodes	First appearance	Date aired	Last appearance	Date aired
Roger Delgado	37 (8 stories)	Terror of the Autons	2 January 1971	Frontier in Space	31 March 1973
Peter Pratt	4 (1 story)	The Deadly Assassin	30 October 1976	The Deadly Assassin	20 November 1976
Geoffrey Beevers	4 (1 story)	The Keeper of Traken	31 January 1981	The Keeper of Traken	21 February 1981
Anthony Ainley	28 (11 stories)	The Keeper of Traken	21 February 1981	Survival	6 December 1989
Eric Roberts	1 (1 story)	Doctor Who	27 May 1996	Doctor Who	27 May 1996
Derek Jacobi	1 (1 story)	"Utopia"	16 June 2007	"Utopia"	16 June 2007
John Simm	7 (3 stories)	"Utopia"	16 June 2007	"The Doctor Falls"	1 July 2017
Michelle Gomez	15 (12 stories) (Note: Gomez is uncredited in two of these stories ("Into the Dalek" and "The Caretaker").)	"Deep Breath"	23 August 2014	"The Doctor Falls"	1 July 2017
Sacha Dhawan	5 (3 stories)	"Spyfall"	1 January 2020	"The Power of the Doctor"	23 October 2022

== See also ==
- List of Doctor Who villains
- List of television programs where multiple actors played one character
