= The Iytean Menace =

Tabletop role-playing game adventure

Front cover, featuring the right half of Paris Street; Rainy Day by Gustave Caillebotte

Back cover: the left half of Caillebotte's painting, with modern figures added by William H. Keith Jr.

The Iytean Menace is an adventure published by FASA in 1985 for The Doctor Who Role Playing Game.

== Plot summary ==
The player characters are assumed to be members of the Celestial Intervention Agency, and are sent to London in 1885 to investigate who brought some advanced technology there, and ensure the Time Stream is not damaged. In addition to the adventure, the book contains background information on Victorian London, the alien race known as Iyteans, as well as a large section of advice for the gamemaster.

== Publication history ==
FASA published The Doctor Who Roleplaying Game in 1985, and quickly released two adventures, The Lords of Destiny, and The Iytean Menace, a 48-page softcover book with a cardstock card written by J. Andrew Keith, with additional material by William H. Keith Jr., and Tom Kokkelenberg, and interior artwork by Dana Andrews, Jane K. Bigos, David J. Hutchins, William H. Keith Jr., and Todd F. Marsh. The wrap-around cover art is the 1877 painting Paris Street; Rainy Day by Gustave Caillebotte, with two modern-day figures on the back cover added by William H. Keith Jr.: a woman in a miniskirt and go-go boots, and a man with long hair and a gold medallion. Keith also altered one of Caillebotte's figures, turning a man's head to face the viewer, and altering the face to resemble The Third Doctor.

== Reception ==
In the April 1986 edition of White Dwarf (Issue #76), Barry Bailey reviewed both The Lords of Destiny and The Iytean Menace, which had been released simultaneously, and called both of them "very accurate simulations of the kind of stories that have made Dr. Who a popular TV regular for over 20 years." Bailey confessed that The Iytean Menace was "my favourite of the two [...] attractively illustrated with period woodcuts that enhance the carefully created Victorian atmosphere." He also enjoyed the plot, which he called "challenging, but not too intricate, and manages to interweave a healthy dose of Robert Louis Stevenson into the proceedings quite adroitly." He concluded by giving it an above-average overall rating of 8 out of 10, saying, "Gamers of the Rambo 'shoot-em-up' style of role-playing would get nothing out of it - what is called for is subtlety, tact and ingenuity."

The review in the November–December 1986 edition of Different Worlds (Issue #44) also covered both The Lords of Destiny and The Iytean Menace, and proposed that neither was strikingly original, commenting, "Longtime fans of the series will agree that these concepts are nothing that the series hasn't shown more than once; only the details vary from other stories (of course, this is not necessarily bad, since really original ideas are extremely rare)." However, in the case of The Iytean Menace, the reviewer pointed out problems with plot if the players do not use characters that are agents of the Celestial Intervention Agency, and suggested that "the writer should have made a passing suggestion on what the gamemaster should do." The reviewer also criticized the complete lack of maps except for a general map of Victorian London, noting the extra work this would make for the gamemaster. The review concluded by giving this book a rating of 3 out of 4, saying, "Worth buying [...] what a good Doctor Who adventure needs to succeed."
