= Nocra prison camp =

Italian prison camp in Eritrea

The Nocra prison camp was an Italian prison camp established on the island of Nocra, off the coast of Massawa, in the Italian colony of Eritrea, that was used to intern some 500-1500 political prisoners.

Years after the official end of the Second Italo-Abyssinian War, the Italian authorities sent Ethiopian and Eritrean intellectuals and political prisoners with their families there. It was dismantled in 1941 after British forces occupied the island after the Battle of Keren.

Conditions there were abysmal and have been described as worse than in other camps of Italian East Africa like Danane concentration Camp. Temperatures there regularly reached over 50 degrees Celsius, and Nocra was a hotbed for malaria and dysentery. Internees were subject to forced labour in stone quarries, manufacturing cement, or at AGIP oil sites - regularly dying of exhaustion and sunstroke

== History ==
Blatta Gebre Egziabehe, famous anti-colonial writer and advisor to Emperor Menelik II, was detained at Nocra from July 1899 onwards and famously escaped on November 17th among 107 other detainees before travelling to Inderta, Tigray.

In 1937, the camp is recorded to have held 500 prisoners serving life sentences.

In 1939, as most Ethiopian political prisoners were being returned from Italy, some were deported to Nocra. This, in combination with other arrivals, increased the number of detainees to 1500.

== See also ==
- Italian concentration camps
- Italian East Africa
