= Dahalik language =

Semitic language spoken in Eritrea

Dahalik
- Dahaalik, Dahalik, Dahlak
- Native to: Eritrea
- Region: Dahlak Archipelago
- Native speakers: 3,100 (2023)
- Language family: Afro-Asiatic: Semitic; West Semitic; South Semitic; Ethiopic; North; Dahalik–Tigre; Dahalik

Language codes
- ISO 639-3: dlk
- Glottolog: daha1247
- ELP: Dahālík
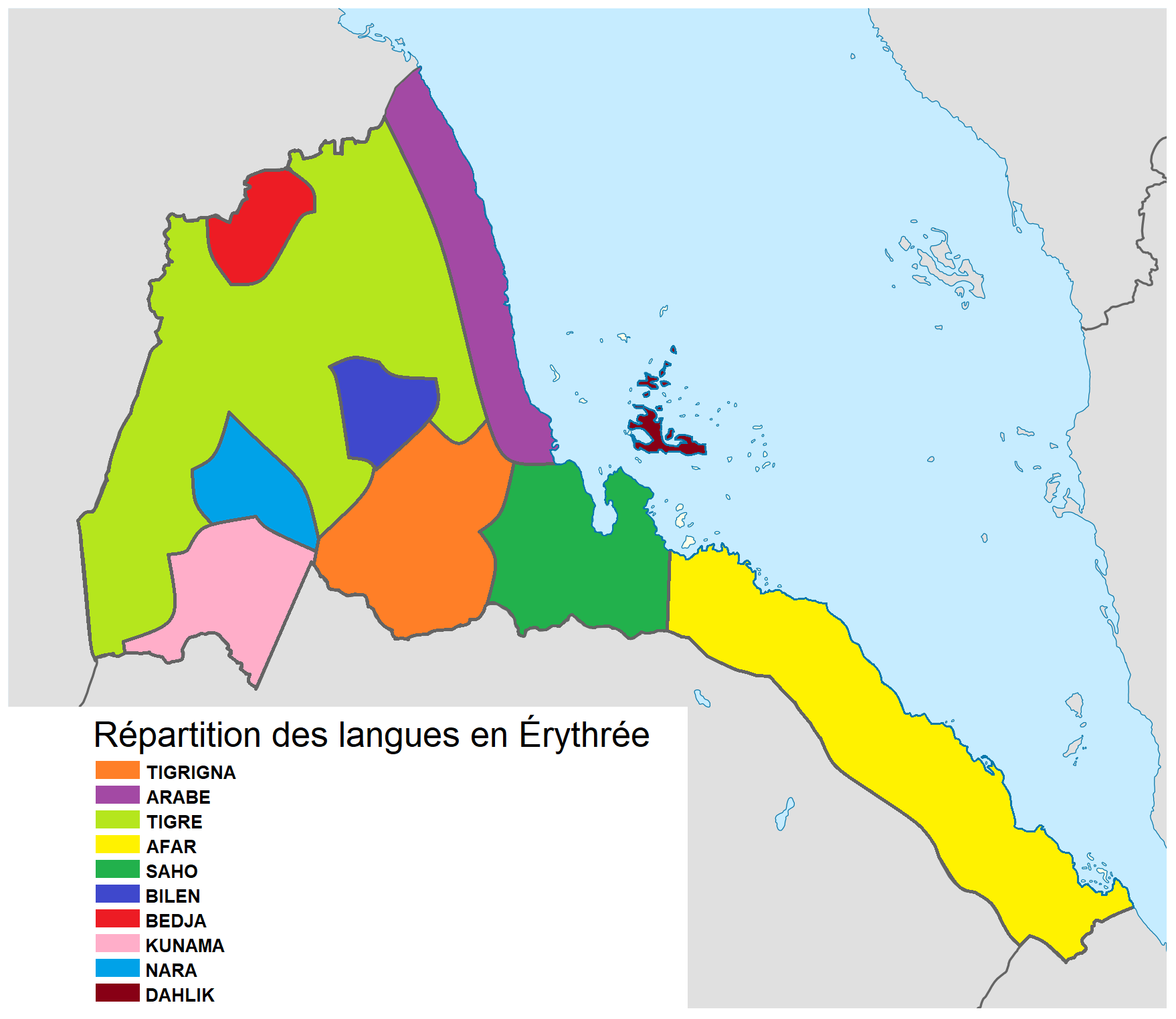
- Linguistic map of Eritrea; Dahalik is spoken in the dark purple island region (the coastal region, a lighter shade of purple, is the Arabic-speaking area)

- Dahalik is classified as "critically endangered" by the UNESCO Atlas of the World's Languages in Danger

Dahalik (ዳሃሊክ [haka (na)] dahālík, "[language (of)] the people of Dahlak"; also Dahaalik, Dahlik, Dahlak) is an endangered Afroasiatic language spoken exclusively in the Dahlak Archipelago in Eritrea. Its speech area is off the coast of Massawa, on three islands in the Dahlak Archipelago: Dahlak Kebir, Nora, and Dehil.

Dahalik belongs to the Afro-Asiatic family's Semitic branch, a member of the Ethiopic group, and is closely related to Tigre and Tigrinya. It is said to be not mutually intelligible with Tigre and, according to Simeone-Senelle, is sufficiently different to be considered a separate language. However, there are those who disagree.

== Status ==
Dahalik is spoken on the Dahlak Archipelago, an island group belonging to Eritrea in the Red Sea. On the archipelago, most people are speakers of Dahalik with smaller populations of Arabic and Afar native speakers. The situation is different for every village: Durrubishet and Dasquo have almost universal use of Dahalik, while other villages have a greater mix of languages. Most islanders are multilingual in Dahalik, Arabic, and Afar, while the language of education is Arabic. Most Dahalik men have regular contact with Arabic, Tigre, and Afar, and any mixed marriages usually result in the children learning two mother tongues. Dahalik speakers also consider their language to be a mix of Arabic, Tigre, and a small amount of Tigrinya. Overall, there are only a few elderly monolingual speakers of Dahalik. However, Dahalik speakers do have positive attitudes towards the language and see it as an essential part of their cultural identity.

== Phonology ==
=== Vowels ===
/ɛ/ might be another vowel. The vowel /ə/ only occurs in unstressed syllables.

Vowels
	Front	Back
Close	i	u
Open-mid	e	o
Open	a	

=== Consonants ===
Dahalik has 21 consonants.

Consonants
		Labial	Alveolar		Post- alveolar	Palatal	Velar	Uvular	Pharyngeal	Glottal
		Labial	plain	emphatic	Post- alveolar	Palatal	Velar	Uvular	Pharyngeal	Glottal
Plosive	voiceless		t	tˤ ~ tʼ	tʃʼ		k	q		(ʔ)
Plosive	voiced	b	d			ɟ				
Fricative	voiceless	f	s	sˤ ~ sʼ	ʃ			(χ)	ħ	h
Fricative	voiced		(z)		ʒ			(ʁ)	ʕ	ɦ
Nasal		m	n							
Approximant			l			j	w			
Trill			r							

- The emphatic alveolar ṭ is described by Simeone-Senelle as pharyngealized [tˤ], as in Arabic, with pharyngealization being weak Idris describes ṭ as an ejective [tʼ], as in Tigre and other mainland Ethiopian Semitic languages. It is only found in native vocabulary in the dialect of Dehil, and corresponds to both Ethiopian Semitic ṭ and ṣ. The Dahlak Kebir and Nora dialects have /ʔ/ in its place in these cases.
- /tʃʼ/ is rare and limited to loanwords.
- The voiced uvular fricative /ʁ/ is the most common articulation of /q/ in the intervocalic position, while the voiceless uvular fricative /χ/ is used after a fricative.
- The velar fricative /x/ and the voiced alveolar sibilant /z/ are only used in loanwords from Arabic. Original Ethiopian Semitic *z has become /d/.

== Morphology ==
=== Pronouns ===
Dahalik has two different forms for second and third person pronouns, one masculine and one feminine.

	Singular		Plural	
	masculine	feminine	masculine	feminine
1st person	ana		neħna	
2nd person	enta	enti	intum	intun
3rd person	itu	ita	itun	itan

Dahalik also has dependent (object) pronouns, suffixed to the end of the word.

	Singular		Plural	
	masculine	feminine	masculine	feminine
1st person	-(h)e, -ni	-(he), -ni	-na	
2nd person	-ak	-ik	-kum	-kan
3rd person	-o, -(h)u	-a	-(h)um	-(h)an

=== Verbs ===
The word order of a simple sentence in Dahalik is subject–object–verb. For conditional subordinate clauses, the subordinating marker ('if' or something similar) is at the end of the clause or just before the verb in the subordinating clause.
