= Dahlak Archipelago =

Eritrean island group in the Red Sea

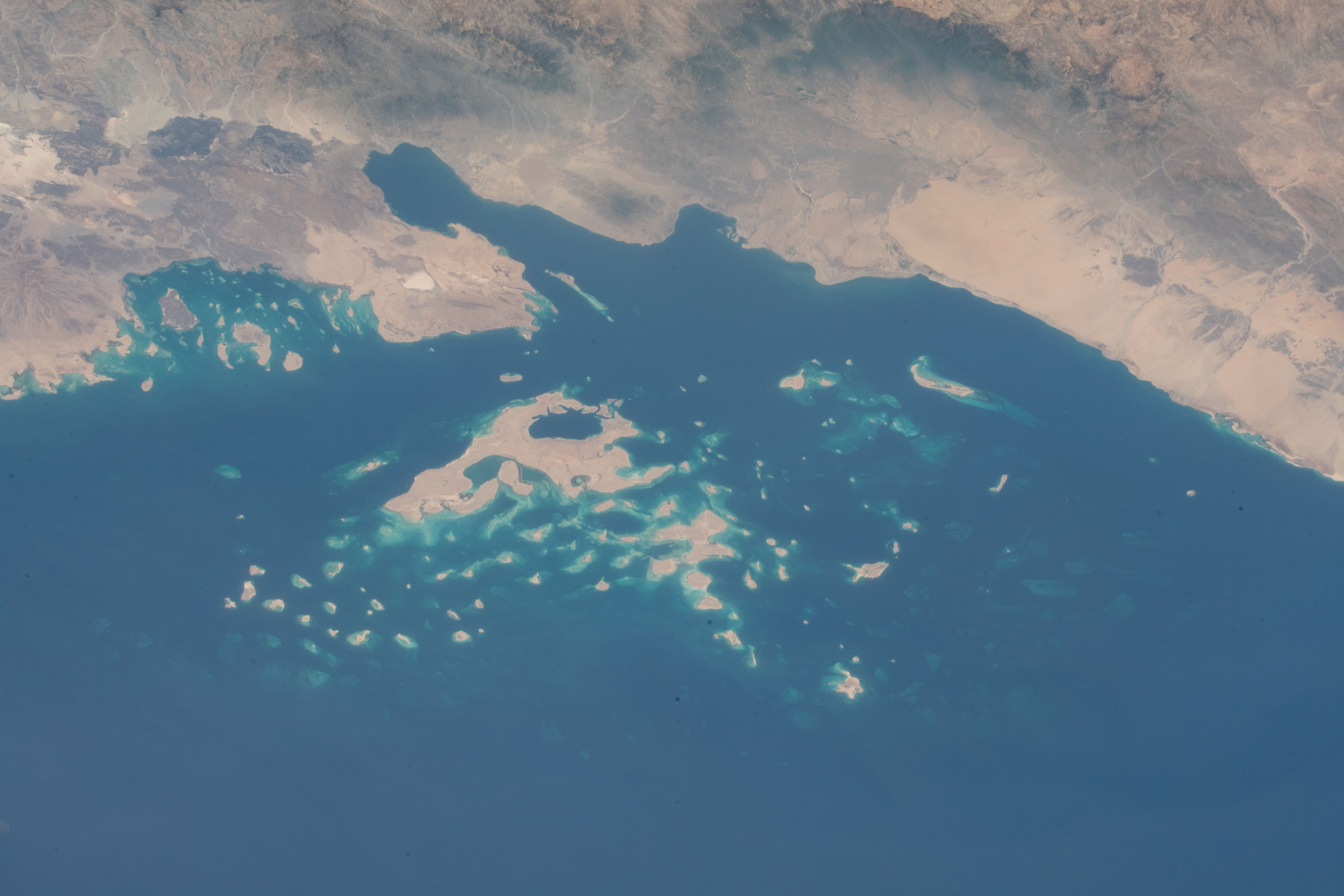

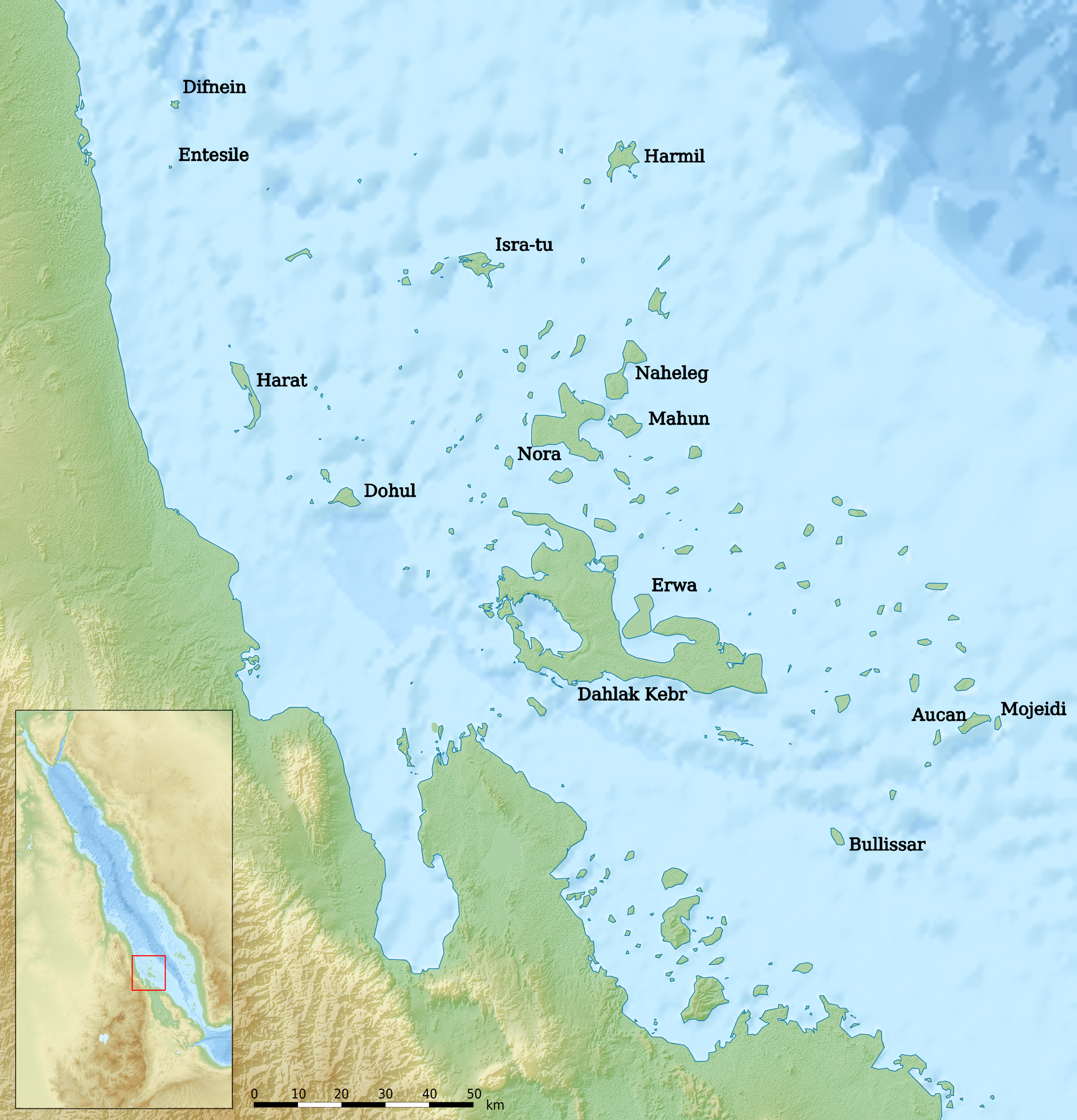

- Location of Dahlak Archipelago off the coast of Eritrea

Geography
- Coordinates: 15°50′N 40°12′E
- Adjacent to: Red Sea
- Major islands: Dahlak Kebir, Dhuladhiya, Dissei, Dohul (Dehil), Erwa

Administration
- Eritrea

Demographics
- Population: c. 3,000
- Languages: Dahalik

The Dahlak Archipelago is an Eritrean island group located in the Red Sea, measuring around 643 square km (248 square miles) and lying roughly 58 kilometers (31 nautical miles, 36 miles) east of Massawa, the regional capital city.

== Etymology ==
The etymology of the name remains obscure. Al-Hamdani, al-Idrisi, and Yaqut used the form "dahlak," while Yaqut also recorded "dahlik." According to Yaqut and al-Idrisi, "dahlak" is a foreign word that became Arabicized. Moshe Piamenta states that "dahlak" means "big merchant."

== History ==
G.W.B. Huntingford has identified with the Dahlak archipelago a group of islands near Adulis called "Alalaiou" in the Periplus of the Erythraean Sea which were a source of tortoise shell. According to Edward Ullendorff, the Dahlak islanders were amongst the first people in the Horn of Africa to embrace Islam, and a number of tombstones in Kufic script attest to this early connection.

After Abyssinian pirates attacked Jeddah in 702, the Dahlak Islands were occupied by Muslims, becoming a strategic Islamic foothold in the Horn of Africa. The Umayyad Caliph Abd al-Malik ibn Marwan used the islands as a prison. Under Caliph Umar ibn Abd al-Aziz, Yazid ibn al-Muhallab, the governor of Khurasan, was sentenced to exile in Dahlak in 717–718 but was later allowed to remain imprisoned in Aleppo. The poet Al-Ahwas Al-Ansari was exiled to Dahlak for four to five years for writing satirical verses against Caliph Sulayman ibn Abd al-Malik but was later permitted to leave the "land of thorns" by Caliph Yazid II.

Between around 1140 and 1249, the Dahlak Islands were ruled by a line of sultans, with the title reserved for rulers wielding real political and military power. The first known use of "sultan" dates to 1093, but it may have referred to a "blessed" individual rather than a ruler. Titles such as "defender of Islam" mirrored those of Nur al-Din Mahmud of Aleppo, reflecting a Sunni character. In 1125–1126, the amir al-Muwaffaq from Egypt attempted to arrest Ibn Nab in Dahlak. The genealogical record of the sultans is incomplete, as many rulers are identified only in the epitaphs of others. The da'i Ibn Hibbat al-Dawla met with Muhammad ibn Abi al-Arab of Aden in Dahlak around 1119–1120.

In the 13th century, Ibn Sa'id al-Maghribi mentions that the king of Dahlak was an Abyssinian Muslim who maintained his independence from the ruler of Yemen. And according to Abulfeda, the island was ruled by a local "Abyssinian" Muslim who had contacts with the Mamluk Sultanate and the Rasulid dynasty of Yemen. In 1517 the Ottoman Turks conquered the islands and placed them under the rule of the Pasha at Suakin as part of the province of Habesh. By 1526 the Dahalik sultan, Ahmad, had been degraded to a tributary. There was a short revival of the sultanate during the Abyssinian-Adal war, where the sultanate of Adal waged a temporarily successful jihad against the Ethiopian Empire. Sultan Ahmad joined the Adal Empire and was rewarded with the port town of Arkiko. However, in 1541, one year after the death of sultan Ahmad, the Portuguese returned and destroyed Dahlak yet again. Sixteen years later, the islands were occupied by the Ottoman Empire again, who made them part of the Habesh Eyalet.

In the second half of the 19th century, the islands temporarily came under the Khedivate of Egypt, but they remained a backwater. In 1889 the Italians occupied Eritrea and established a vice-residency on the island of Nokra. The census of 1931 gave a total of 2,275 inhabitants, composed of 1,475 Tigre, 475 Arabs and 325 Afar. However, during this time the islands were home to little except the Nocra prison camp operated by the Italian colonial forces.

After Ethiopia allied itself with the Soviet Union during the Cold War, following the rise of the Derg, the Dahlak Archipelago was the location of a Soviet Navy base (Nokra Naval Base). In 1990, Ethiopia lost control of the Dahlak Archipelago and the northern Eritrean coast to the Eritrean independence movement (EPLF) and by 1991 Ethiopia had lost control of all of Eritrea. Following the international recognition of Eritrean independence in 1993, the Dahlak Archipelago became a part of Eritrea.

== Geography ==
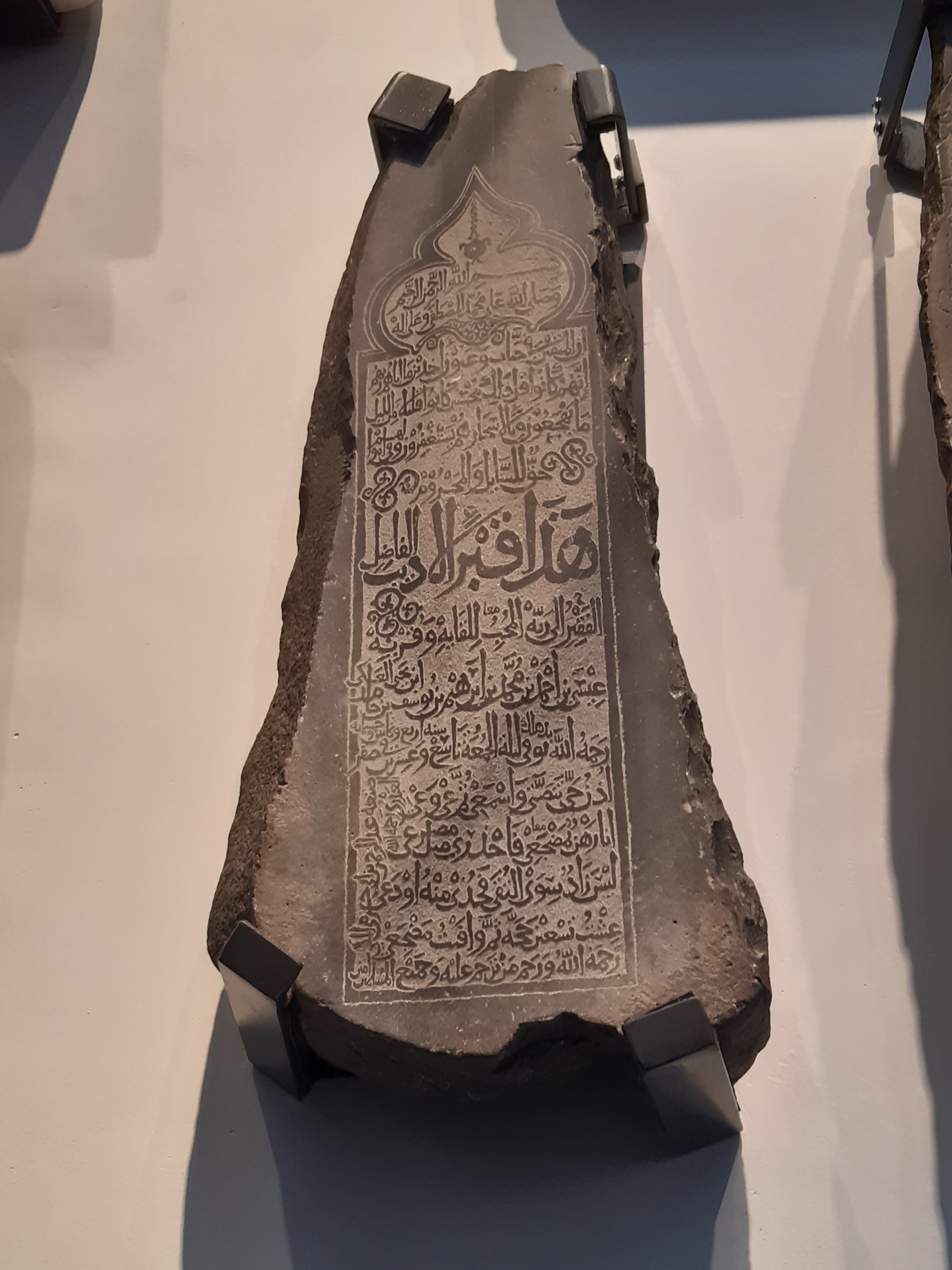
Tombstone from Dahlak dated to early 13th century AD in the British Museum

Consisting of two larger and 124 smaller islands, only three of the islands are permanently inhabited, with Dahlak Kebir being the largest and most populated. Other islands of the archipelago are Dhuladhiya, Dissei, Dohul (Dehil), Erwa, Harat, Harmil, Inghel, Isra-Tu, Nahaleg, Nakura, Nora (Norah) and Shumma.

=== Demography ===
Besides Dahlak Kebir, only Nora and Dohul are permanently inhabited. Residents of the archipelago speak Dahlik and maintain a traditional way of life, including fishing, shepherding and raising camels. The local pearl fisheries of the archipelago have been famous since Roman times, and still produce a substantial number of pearls.

=== Access ===
Tourism is increasing. The islands can be reached by boat from Massawa and are popular with scuba divers and snorkellers.

== Environment ==
The islands and surrounding seas, with their coral reefs and shoals, are rich in marine life, including seabirds and waders. Some islands are fringed with mangroves and others with salt brush scrub. Dolphins, dugongs, sharks, and turtles can be seen as well as a variety of invertebrates.

=== Important Bird Area ===
The archipelago has been designated an Important Bird Area (IBA) by BirdLife International because it supports significant populations of spotted sandgrouse, white-eyed gulls, lesser crested terns, lesser kestrels, sooty falcons, greater hoopoe-larks, blackstarts and cinereous buntings.

== See also ==
- Sultanate of Dahlak
- Dahlak Marine National Park
- Dahalik language
