= The Lords of Destiny =

Role-playing game supplement

Cover art by William H. Keith Jr., featuring an image of The Third Doctor

The Lords of Destiny is an adventure published by FASA in 1985 for The Doctor Who Role Playing Game.

== Plot summary ==
The Lords of Destiny is an adventure in which the Companions are sent aboard a gigantic 10,000 km long World-Ship that is moving through space at near-light speed, destroying any planets that lie in its path. A ruling computer keeps the ship's inhabitants unaware of this destruction or that anything exists outside the ship. Meanwhile, rebels are trying to overthrow the tyrannical Captain-Lords.

== Publication history ==
FASA published The Doctor Who Roleplaying Game in 1985, and quickly released two adventures, The Iytean Menace and this one, The Lords of Destiny, a 48-page softcover book with a cardstock card written by William H. Keith Jr. Keith also provided illustrations and cover art, with additional interior art by Dana Knutson, Todd Marsh, Jane Bigos, and David J. Hutchins.

== Reception ==
In the April 1986 edition of White Dwarf (Issue #76), Barry Bailey reviewed both The Lords of Destiny and The Iytean Menace, which had been released simultaneously, and called both of them "very accurate simulations of the kind of stories that have made Dr. Who a popular TV regular for over 20 years." Although Bailey pointed out that both adventures required more of an investigative approach rather than "a 'Rambo shoot-em-up' style of role-playing," he thought The Lords of Destiny was "more likely to spawn a firefight." He noted that "This scenario encourages imaginative refereeing, and plenty of characterisation." He concluded by giving it an above-average overall rating of 8 out of 10, saying, "it's just another 'spaceship puts the Universe at risk, aw, golly gosh' story."

The review in the November–December 1986 edition of Different Worlds (Issue #44) also covered both The Lords of Destiny and The Iytean Menace, and proposed that neither was strikingly original, commenting, "Longtime fans of the series will agree that these concepts are nothing that the series hasn't shown more than once; only the details vary from other stories (of course, this is not necessarily bad, since really original ideas are extremely rare)." The review complimented the book for allowing the players room to strike out on their own, while giving the gamemaster suggestions for what to do if the players did leave the main plotline. However, the review criticized the complete lack of maps in the book, noting the extra work for the gamemaster that this would entail. The review concluded by giving this book a rating of 3 out of 4, saying, "Worth buying [...] What a good Doctor Who adventure needs to succeed."
