= Dissei =

Coordinates: 15°28′15″N 39°44′52″E

Dissei (Seil Rock) is an island in the Dahlak archipelago in the Red Sea, Eritrea.

It is the only mountainous island in the archipelago and one of the few inhabited. The seabed is rich in life and migratory fish, the coral is maintained up to 30 meters. However, the water is often cloudy due to the large presence of plankton. The population lives from fishing and the shell trade.
