= Nora (island) =

Island in the Dahlak Archipelago, Eritrea

Coordinates: 16.050°N 40.060°E

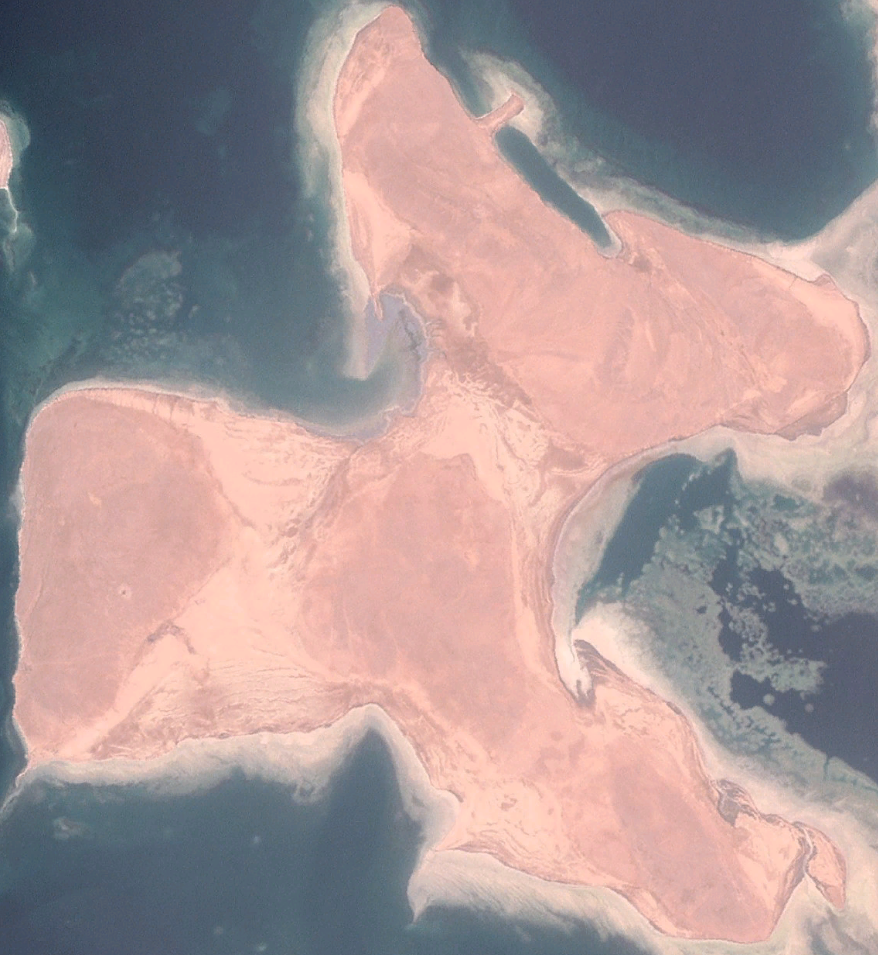
View of the island from space.

Nora (also transliterated: Norah) is the second largest island in the Dahlak Archipelago, Eritrea, and one of the three inhabited islands of the archipelago. It has an area of 105.15 km^{2} (40.60 sq mi). It reaches a maximum height of 37 meters in the northeast.

In 2009 the island had a population of 373 in 66 households.

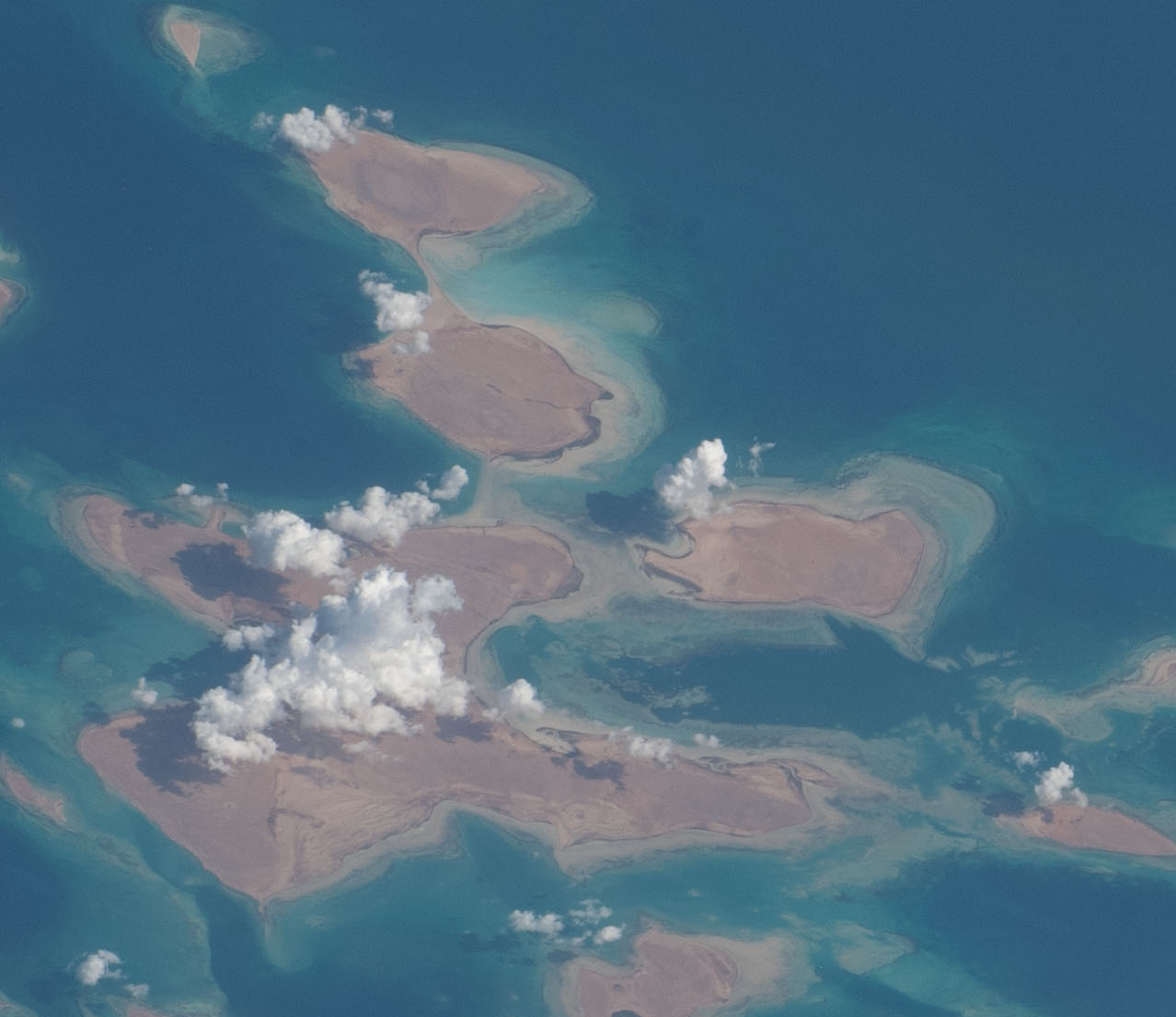
nearby islands Nahaleg, Mahun and Nora Island with clouds
