= The Eight Doctors =

1997 novel by Terrance Dicks

- Author: Terrance Dicks
- Series: Doctor Who Eighth Doctor Adventures
- Release number: 1
- Subject: Featuring: Eighth Doctor, Sam
- Set in: Period immediately after Doctor Who (1996) and Shada (Eighth Doctor continuity)
- Publisher: BBC Books
- Publication date: June 1997
- ISBN: 0-563-40563-5
- Followed by: Vampire Science

The Eight Doctors is a BBC Books original novel written by Terrance Dicks and based on the long-running British science fiction television series Doctor Who. It was the first of the Eighth Doctor Adventures range (it was preceded by a novelisation of the 1996 film, but the BBC chose not to consider it to be part of the range) and features the Eighth Doctor and introduces his new companion, Sam Jones. The novel takes place immediately after the 1996 television movie.

== Plot ==
Immediately after the events of the TV film, the Eighth Doctor finishes reading The Time Machine (a book written by his old friend H. G. Wells). After checking the Eye of Harmony in his TARDIS, he falls prey to a final trap set by his old enemy, the Master; which erases all of his memory. The only fact he knows for certain is that his name is "the Doctor" – but Doctor who? His instincts tell him to "trust the TARDIS", which immediately lands.

He lands at a scrapyard at 76 Totters Lane, London in 1997. There, he encounters Sam Jones, a young lady that is being accused by local drug dealers, led by Baz Bailey, of "grassing" them over to the police. The dealers intend to force Sam into taking drugs to get her addicted, but the Doctor saves her and falls foul of the local police who promptly charge him with possession and selling the cocaine he has confiscated from the thugs. Sam tells her two teachers, who have noticed her lateness, and takes them back to the junkyard to verify the story. In the confusion of Bailey's desperate attack on the local police station, the Doctor escapes and runs back into the TARDIS and it dematerialises – taking the cocaine with him to dispose of it safely. This leaves Sam alone, defenceless against the knife-wielding druggies.

The TARDIS lands in the year 100,000 BC, and he meets his first incarnation in the jungle and they psychically link (giving the Eighth Doctor his memories up to that point in his life). The Eighth Doctor stops his other self from killing a caveman who was slowing their party down. The First Doctor explains that he must get away before the "time bubble" his Eighth self is in bursts and starts to damage the timeline. The Eighth Doctor then leaves.

The TARDIS then lands during the events of The War Games, where he helps his second incarnation, Jamie McCrimmon and Zoe Heriot with their important mission to contact the Time Lords. Having regained his second life's memories, he leaves happily.

He next meets the Third Doctor, who himself has just fought the Master and the Sea Devils; and has saved humanity by blowing up a Sea Devil base. He, blaming his Eighth self for his exile to Earth and for the Master's concurrent escape, threatens him with the Master's Tissue Compression Eliminator. But he tosses the weapon to him instead. The Master has again escaped to fight another day, and the Eighth Doctor leaves.

Having landed during the events of State of Decay, the Eighth Doctor gives the Fourth Doctor an emergency blood transfusion after his younger self is attacked and nearly fatally drained by another group of vampires, and leaves with yet more memories (to the astonishment of companion Romana).

Meanwhile, back on Gallifrey, Lady President Flavia has noticed the Doctor crossing his timelines and demands that he be carefully watched. A Time Lord called Ryoth demands the Doctor be executed: the resulting paradoxes could be irreversible. Flavia denies this. Ryoth alerts the Celestial Intervention Agency to the situation, and the Agency give him access to the fabled Timescoop technology, perfectly preserved since the Death Zone incident. He uses it to send a Raston Warrior Robot to the Fifth Doctor and his companions, Tegan Jovanka and Vislor Turlough. Luckily, the Eighth Doctor then arrives at the aftermath of "The Five Doctors", where he saves his fifth incarnation and his companions from the Raston Warrior Robot and a passing platoon of Sontarans by tricking the two into fighting each other. The Doctors create a feedback system, so when Ryoth sends a Drashig to kill them, it instead materialises in the same room as Ryoth and eats him and the Timescoop. It is then caught and transmatted to the Death Zone by guards in the Capitol in the hopes that it will take care of the other horrors there.

Soon he arrives in the middle of his second trial by the Time Lords; which his Sixth self seems to be losing (especially as the insidious Valeyard has just accused him of a mass genocide attack against the Vervoids). After giving him advice and encouragement- as well as helping to begin an investigation into his past self's trial on Gallifrey-, he leaves, his memories almost completely intact.

He finally arrives on the planet Metebelis Three, where the alone and depressed Seventh Doctor is trapped by a giant spider. After rescuing his former self (by killing the arachnid with the TCE), he remembers leaving Sam, and immediately dashes back into the TARDIS to her rescue.

Once saved by the Doctor, Sam decides to join him on his travels.

== Continuity ==
Terrance Dicks wrote this book not only to begin this ongoing book series, but also as an attempt to rectify the various continuity problems that had emerged from the 1996 film; he made no secret of the fact he hated the 1996 television film, making the Doctor look back over the preceding adventure as though it was the most confusing, nonsensical time of his life (as Dicks pointed out in a 2005 edition of Doctor Who Magazine).

This story appears to contradict some of the continuity set in place by the Virgin New Adventures and Virgin Missing Adventures, such as the freedom of Borusa from Rassilon's imprisonment (Borusa having been freed in Blood Harvest, itself written by Dicks), the identity of the President of Gallifrey (Flavia in this novel), and Romana in the subjectively later Virgin New Adventures, and the circumstances (albeit described only in brief) of the First Doctor's departure from Gallifrey. The BBC novels were not initially intended to be part of the same continuity as the earlier Virgins, although BBC novelists restored some continuity between the two ranges, for example by reinstating Romana as president in The Shadows of Avalon. Some issues at least may be explained away by assuming that, from the point of view of the Time Lords, the Eighth Doctor's role in The Eight Doctors actually occurs prior to the seventh Doctor's role in Blood Harvest. However, throughout the range certain contradictory elements still exist.

When Sam tells the Doctor that her surname is Jones, and the Doctor tells her that his is "Smith", she says that they were made for each other. It also foreshadows the revelations that would eventually be made about Sam's origins. A similar pun shows up in the title of the 2007 series episode "Smith and Jones", with the Tenth Doctor and new companion Martha Jones. Martha also uses the alias of "Sam Jones" in the spin-off series Torchwood.
