= Dahlak Kebir =

Largest island in the Dahlak Archipelago, Eritrea

دهلك كبير Grande Dahlac
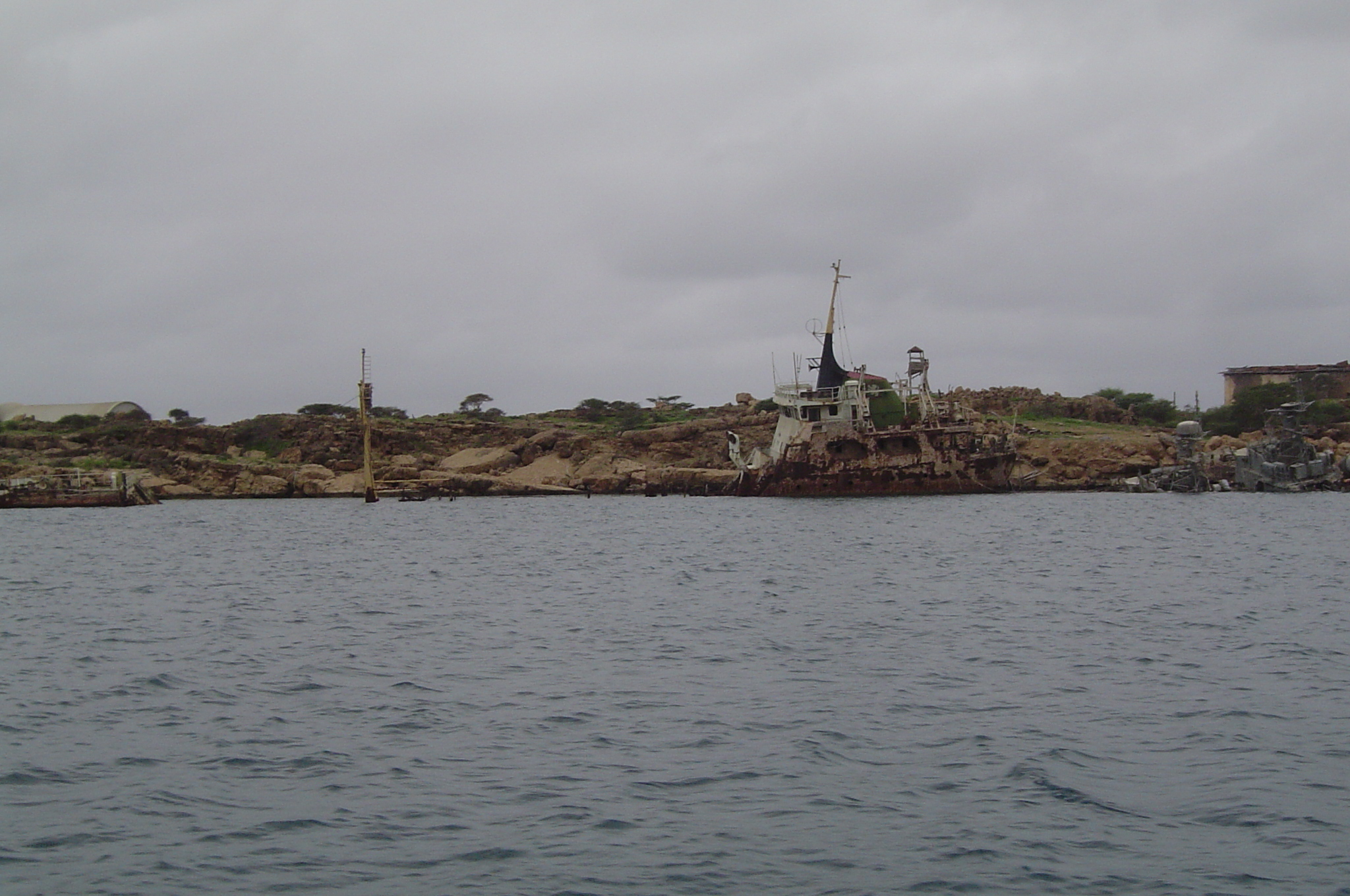
- Wrecks on Dahlak Kebir island

- Location within Eritrea

Geography
- Location: Red Sea
- Coordinates: 15.722469°N 40.089111°E
- Archipelago: Dahlak Archipelago

Administration
- Eritrea
- Largest settlement: Dahlak Kebir

Demographics
- Population: 2,500

Dahlak Kebir (Arabic: دهلك كبير, Italian: Grande Dahlac) is the largest island of the Dahlak Archipelago. Situated in the Red Sea off of the coast of Eritrea, it was formerly called Dahlak Deset.

== Overview ==
Dahlak Kebir has a population of around 2,500 people speaking the Dahalik language. Its major industries include fishing, sea cucumber collection and tourism.

The village of Dahlak Kebir lies on the west of the island and is known for its ancient cisterns and necropolis, dating from at least AD 912. It is also known for its fossils. Other features of the island include pre-Islamic ruins at Adel, wildlife, and mangrove swamps. Ferries link the island with Massawa and several smaller islands.
