= List of other Doctor Who home video releases =

This is a list of Doctor Who serials and episodes that have been released on VHS, Betamax, LaserDisc, Video 2000, and Universal Media Disc (UMD).

== VHS releases ==
Releases on the VHS format.

=== First Doctor ===
Season	Story no.	Serial name	Duration	Release date		
Season	Story no.	Serial name	Duration	UK	Australia	USA / Canada
1	1	An Unearthly Child	4 × 25 min.	5 February 1990	July 1990	January 1991
1	1	An Unearthly Child (remastered)	4 × 25 min.	4 September 2000	October 2000	—N/a
1	2	The Daleks	7 × 25 min.	5 June 1989	December 1989	October 1993
1	2	The Daleks (remastered)	7 × 25 min.	26 February 2001	April 2001	—N/a
1	3	The Edge of Destruction (Note: Also includes pilot episode of An Unearthly Child)	2 × 25 min. 1 × 30 min	May 2000	May 2000	10 October 2000 (Note: Includes The Missing Years)
1	5	The Keys of Marinus	6 × 25 min.	March 1999	May 1999	July 1999
1	6	The Aztecs	4 × 25 min.	November 1992	February 1993	18 May 1994
1	7	The Sensorites	6 × 25 min.	—N/a (Note: Part of The First Doctor: Special Edition Box Set)		7 October 2003
1	8	The Reign of Terror (Note: Also includes The Faceless Ones episodes 1 and 3, and The Web of Fear episode 1)	4 × 25 min.	24 November 2003	December 2003	7 October 2003
2	9	Planet of Giants	3 × 25 min.	January 2002	March 2002	May 2003
2	10	The Dalek Invasion of Earth	6 × 25 min.	May 1990	November 1990	February 1994
2	11; 12	The Rescue; The Romans	6 × 25 min.	September 1994	November 1994	March 1996
2	13	The Web Planet	6 × 25 min.	September 1990	May 1991	August 1994
2	14; 15	The Crusade; The Space Museum	6 × 25 min.	5 July 1999	July 1999	January 2000
2	16	The Chase (Note: Released in a box set alongside Remembrance of the Daleks)	6 × 25 min.	September 1993	September 1993	October 1993
2	17	The Time Meddler	4 × 25 min.	—N/a		7 October 2003
3	23	The Ark	4 × 25 min.	5 October 1998	February 1999	March 1999
3	21	Daleks: The Early Years; The Daleks' Master Plan (Note: Episodes 5 and 10)	2 × 25 min.	6 July 1992	February 1993	October 1993
3	25	The Gunfighters	4 × 25 min.	—N/a		October 2003
3	27	The War Machines	4 × 25 min.	2 June 1997	January 1998	31 March 1998
1, 2, 3	7, 17, 25	The First Doctor: Special Edition; The Sensorites; The Time Meddler; The Gunfighters	14 × 25 min.	4 November 2002	December 2002	—N/a
2, 3	14, 24	The Hartnell Years (Note: Also includes pilot episode of An Unearthly Child); The Crusade (Note: Episode 3); The Celestial Toymaker (Note: Episode 4)	1 × 35 min. 2 × 25 min.	3 July 1991	May 1992	January 1992
4	29	The Tenth Planet	4 × 25 min.	6 November 2000	November 2000	May 2001

=== Second Doctor ===
Season	Story no.	Serial name	Duration	Release date		
Season	Story no.	Serial name	Duration	UK	Australia	USA / Canada
4	32	The Underwater Menace (Note: Episode 3) (Note: Includes The Missing Years)	1 × 25 min.	November 1998	December 1998	February 2001
4	36	Daleks: The Early Years; The Evil of the Daleks (Note: Episode 2)	1 × 25 min.	6 July 1992	February 1993	October 1993
5	37	The Tomb of the Cybermen	4 × 25 min.	5 May 1992	May 1992	8 October 1992
5	39	The Ice Warriors	4 × 25 min. 1 × 10 min. (Note: Reconstruction of missing episodes 2 & 3)	2 November 1998	December 1998	September 1999
4, 5	33, 43	Cybermen: The Early Years; The Moonbase (Note: Episodes 2 & 4); The Wheel in Space (Note: Episodes 3 & 6)	4 × 25 min.	6 July 1992	March 1993	10 March 1993
4, 5	35, 41	The Reign of Terror Set; The Faceless Ones (Note: Episodes 1 & 3); The Web of Fear (Note: Episode 1 plus censor clips from episodes 2, 4, and 5)	3 × 25 min.	24 November 2003	December 2003	October 2003
6	44	The Dominators	5 × 25 min.	September 1990	February 1991	August 1994
6	45	The Mind Robber	5 × 25 min.	May 1990	September 1990	February 1994
6	46	The Invasion	6 × 25 min.	June 1993 (2 × VHS)	October 1993	June 1995
6	47	The Krotons	4 × 25 min.	February 1991	July 1991	August 1994
6	48	The Seeds of Death	1 × 150 min.	July 1985	December 1987	March 1990
6	50	The War Games	10 × 25 min.	February 1990	June 1990	January 1992
5, 6	38, 40, 49	The Troughton Years; The Abominable Snowmen; The Enemy of the World (Note: Episode 3); The Space Pirates	3 × 25 min.	3 July 1991	March 1992	16 January 1992

=== Third Doctor ===
Season	Story no.	Serial name	Duration	Release date		
Season	Story no.	Serial name	Duration	UK	Australia	USA / Canada
7	51	Spearhead from Space	1 × 100 min.	February 1988	April 1990	April 1991
7	51	Spearhead from Space	4 × 25 min.	February 1995	—N/a	—N/a
7	52	Doctor Who and the Silurians	7 × 25 min.	July 1993 (2 × VHS)	November 1993	June 1995 (2 × VHS)
7	53	The Ambassadors of Death	7 × 25 min.	May 2002	July 2002	October 2003 (2 × VHS)
7	54	Inferno	7 × 25 min.	May 1994 (2 × VHS)	July 1994	September 1995 (2 × VHS)
8	55	Terror of the Autons	4 × 25 min.	April 1993	June 1993	June 1995
8	56	The Mind of Evil	6 × 25 min.	May 1998 (B+W Re-mastered) (2 × VHS)	March 1999	January 1999 (2 × VHS)
8	57	The Claws of Axos	4 × 25 min.	May 1992	October 1992	June 1996
8	58	Colony in Space	6 × 25 min.	November 2001 (Note: 2 × VHS released as part of a box set "Colony in Space / The Time Monster")	December 2001	January 2003
8	59	The Dæmons	5 × 25 min.	March 1993	July 1993	October 1993
9	60	Day of the Daleks	1 × 100 min.	February 1988	January 1987	March 1989
9	60	Day of the Daleks	4 × 25 min.	April 1994	—N/a	—N/a
9	61	The Curse of Peladon	4 × 25 min.	2 August 1993	November 1993	September 1995
9	62	The Sea Devils	6 × 25 min.	September 1995 (2 × VHS)	July 1996	May 1997 (2 × VHS)
9	63	The Mutants	6 × 25 min.	February 2003	May 2003	October 2003
9	64	The Time Monster	6 × 25 min.	November 2001	December 2001	January 2003
10	65	The Three Doctors	4 × 25 min.	August 1991 (Original); September 2002 (Re-release as part of The Time Lord Collection X4 VHS)	September 1992 Original); April 2003 (Re-release as part of The Time Lord Collection X3 VHS)	January 1992
10	66	Carnival of Monsters	4 × 25 min.	April 1995	May 1995	March 1996
10	67	Frontier in Space	6 × 25 min.	August 1995 (2 × VHS)	November 1995	March 1996 (2 × VHS)
10	68	Planet of the Daleks	6 × 25 min.	November 1999 (2 × VHS)	December 1999	November 2000 (2 × VHS)
10	69	The Green Death	6 × 25 min.	October 1996 (2 × VHS)	April 1997	February 1997 (2 × VHS)
7, 8, 10	54, 59, 67	The Pertwee Years; Inferno (Note: Episode 7); The Daemons (Note: Episode 5); Frontier in Space (Note: Episode 6)	3 × 25 min.	March 1992	October 1992	October 1992
11	70	The Time Warrior	1 × 100 min.	June 1989	March 1989	April 1991
11	71	Invasion of the Dinosaurs	6 × 25 min.	October 2003	February 2004	October 2003
11	72	Death to the Daleks	1 × 100 min.	July 1987	December 1987	March 1990
11	72	Death to the Daleks	4 × 25 min.	February 1995	—N/a	—N/a
11	73	The Monster of Peladon	6 × 25 min.	January 1996 (2 × VHS)	May 1997	May 1997 (2 × VHS)
11	74	Planet of the Spiders	6 × 25 min.	April 1991 (2 × VHS)	September 1991	May 1994

=== Fourth Doctor ===
Season	Story no.	Serial name	Duration	Release date		
Season	Story no.	Serial name	Duration	UK	Australia	USA / Canada
12	75	Robot	4 × 25 min.	February 1992	July 1992	May 1994
12	76	The Ark in Space	1 × 100 min.	June 1989	January 1989	April 1991
12	76	The Ark in Space	4 × 25min.	April 1994	—N/a	—N/a
12	77; 78	The Sontaran Experiment; Genesis of the Daleks	8 × 25 min.	October 1991	July 1992	February 1994
12	79	Revenge of the Cybermen	1 × 100 min.	October 1983; May 1984 (reissue)	January 1987	December 1986
12	79	Revenge of the Cybermen	4 × 25 min.	April 1999	December 1999	—N/a
13	80	Terror of the Zygons	1 × 100 min.	November 1988	April 1987	April 1991
13	80	Terror of the Zygons	4 × 25 min.	August 1999	January 2000	May 2000
13	81	Planet of Evil	4 × 25 min.	February 1994	March 1994	June 1996
13	82	Pyramids of Mars	1 × 100 min.	February 1985	November 1985	February 1988
13	82	Pyramids of Mars	4 × 25 min.	April 1994	—N/a	March 1998
13	83	The Android Invasion	4 × 25 min.	March 1995	March 1995	March 1996
13	84	The Brain of Morbius	1 × 60 min.	July 1984	November 1987	November 1987
13	84	The Brain of Morbius	4 × 25 min.	July 1990	January 1991	February 1997
13	85	The Seeds of Doom	6 × 25 min.	August 1994; 2 × VHS	October 1994	September 1995
14	86	The Masque of Mandragora	4 × 25 min.	August 1991	October 1992	February 1994
14	87	The Hand of Fear	4 × 25 min.	February 1996	May 1997	February 1997
14	88	The Deadly Assassin	4 × 25 min.	October 1991	March 1992	—N/a
14	88	The Deadly Assassin	1 × 100 min.	—N/a	—N/a	March 1989
14	89	The Face of Evil	4 × 25 min	May 1999	June 1999	March 2000
14	90	The Robots of Death	1 × 100 min	February 1988	March 1988	July 1987
14	90	The Robots of Death	4 × 25 min	February 1995	—N/a	—N/a
14	91	The Talons of Weng-Chiang	1 × 150 min.	November 1988	April 1987	February 1988
15	92	Horror of Fang Rock	4 × 25min.	July 1998	November 1998	March 1999
15	93	The Invisible Enemy	4 × 25 min.	September 2002	November 2002	October 2003
15	94	Image of the Fendahl	4 × 25 min.	March 1993	July 1993	June 1996
15	95	The Sun Makers	4 × 25 min.	July 2001	September 2001	February 2002
15	96	Underworld	4 × 25 min.	March 2002	May 2002	May 2003
15	97	The Invasion of Time	6 × 25 min.	March 2000; 2 × VHS	August 2000	August 2000; 2 × VHS
16	98	The Ribos Operation	4 × 25 min	April 1995	June 1995	September 1996
16	99	The Pirate Planet	4 × 25 min	April 1995	June 1995	September 1996
16	100	The Stones of Blood	4 × 25 min	May 1995	July 1995	March 1996
16	101	The Androids of Tara	4 × 25 min	May 1995	July 1995	March 1996
16	102	The Power of Kroll	4 × 25 min	June 1995	August 1995	September 1996
16	103	The Armageddon Factor	6 × 25 min	June 1995	August 1995	September 1996
17	104	Destiny of the Daleks	4 × 25 min	July 1994	August 1994	May 1997
17	105	City of Death	4 × 25 min	April 1991	September 1991	May 1994
17	106	The Creature from the Pit	4 × 25 min	July 2002	October 2002	October 2003
17	107	Nightmare of Eden	4 × 25 min.	December 1998	March 1999	May 1999
17	108	The Horns of Nimon	4 × 25 min.	June 2003	September 2003	October 2003
17	108.5	Shada	—N/a	July 1992	February 1993	October 1992
18	109	The Leisure Hive	4 × 25 min.	January 1997	September 1997	May 1997
18	110	Meglos	4 × 25 min	March 2003	June 2003	October 2003
18	111; 112; 113	The E-Space Trilogy; Full Circle; State of Decay; Warriors' Gate	12 × 25 min	November 1997; 3 × VHS	October 1997; 3 × VHS	July 1998; 3 × VHS
18	114	The Keeper of Traken	4 × 25 min	June 1993	September 1993	February 1994
18	115	Logopolis	4 × 25 min	March 1992	September 1992	October 1993

=== Fifth Doctor ===
Season	Story no.	Serial name	Duration	Release date		
Season	Story no.	Serial name	Duration	UK	Australia	USA / Canada
19	116	Castrovalva	4 × 25 min.	March 1992	September 1992	October 1993
19	117	Four to Doomsday	4 × 25 min.	September 2001	November 2001	June 2002
19	118	Kinda	4 × 24 min.	October 1994	February 1995	June 1996
19	119; 120	The Visitation; Black Orchid	6 × 25 min.	July 1994; 2 × VHS	August 1994	June 1996; 2 × VHS
19	121	Earthshock	4 × 25 min.	September 1992	March 1993	March 1993
19	122	Time-Flight	4 × 25 min.	July 2000	July 2000	March 2001
20	123	Arc of Infinity	4 × 25 min.	March 1994	April 1994	September 1995
20	124	Snakedance	4 × 25 min.	December 1994	February 1995	September 1996
20	125	Mawdryn Undead	4 × 25 min.	November 1992	May 1993	February 1994
20	126	Terminus	4 × 25 min.	February 1993	June 1993	May 1994
20	127	Enlightenment	4 × 25 min.	February 1993	May 1993	August 1994
20	128; 129	The King's Demons "The Five Doctors" - Special Edition	2 × 25 min. 1 × 100 min.	November 1995; 2 × VHS	July 1997; 2 × VHS	February 1997; 2 × VHS
20	129	"The Five Doctors"	1 × 90 min.	September 1985; July 1990	May 1988	March 1989
21	130	Warriors of the Deep	4 × 25 min.	September 1995	July 1996	May 1997
21	131; 132	The Awakening; Frontios	6 × 25 min.	March 1997; 2 × VHS	March 1998	March 1998; 2 × VHS
21	133	Resurrection of the Daleks	4 × 25 min.	November 1993	February 1994	May 1994
21	134	Planet of Fire	4 × 25 min.	September 1998	January 1999	November 1998
21	135	The Caves of Androzani	4 × 25 min.	February 1992	May 1992	October 1992

=== Sixth Doctor ===
Season	Story no.	Serial name	Duration	Release date		
Season	Story no.	Serial name	Duration	UK	Australia	USA / Canada
21	136	The Twin Dilemma	4 × 25 min.	May 1992	May 1993	October 1993
22	137	Attack of the Cybermen	2 × 45 min.	November 2000	November 2000	November 2000
22	138	Vengeance on Varos	2 × 45 min.	May 1993	August 1993	June 1995
22	139	The Mark of the Rani	2 × 45 min.	July 1995	October 1995	February 1997
22	140	The Two Doctors	3 × 45 min.	November 1993	March 1994	June 1995
22	141	Timelash	2 × 45 min.	January 1998	September 1998	March 1998
22	142	Revelation of the Daleks	2 × 45 min.	November 1999	December 1999	February 2001
23	143	The Trial of a Time Lord	14 × 25 min.	October 1993; 3 × VHS	October 1993; 3 × VHS	October 1993; 3 × VHS

=== Seventh Doctor ===
Season	Story no.	Serial name	Duration	Release date		
Season	Story no.	Serial name	Duration	UK	Australia	USA / Canada
24	144	Time and the Rani	4 × 25 min.	July 1995	October 1995	September 1995
24	145	Paradise Towers	4 × 25 min.	October 1995	January 1997	June 1997
24	146	Delta and the Bannermen	3 × 25 min.	March 2001	—N/a	June 2002
24	147	Dragonfire	3 × 25 min.	February 1994	March 1994	February 1997
25	148	Remembrance of the Daleks	4 × 25 min.	September 1993	September 1993	October 1993
25	149	The Happiness Patrol	3 × 25 min.	August 1997	May 1998	March 1998
25	150	Silver Nemesis - Extended Edition	3 × 25 min.	April 1993	June 1993	August 1994
25	151	The Greatest Show in the Galaxy	4 × 25 min.	January 2000	September 1999	November 1999
26	152	Battlefield	4 × 25 min.	March 1998	October 1998	March 1998
26	153	Ghost Light	3 × 25 min.	May 1994	July 1994	June 1996
26	154	The Curse of Fenric	4 × 25 min.	February 1991	July 1991	January 1992
26	155	Survival	3 × 25 min.	October 1995	November 1996	September 1996

=== Eighth Doctor ===
Season	Story no.	Serial name	Duration	Release date		
Season	Story no.	Serial name	Duration	UK	Australia	USA / Canada
—N/a	156	Doctor Who – The Movie	1 × 85 min.	May 1996	November 1996	—N/a

=== Other ===
Release name	Duration	Release date		
Release name	Duration	UK	Australia	USA / Canada
The Tom Baker Years	—N/a	September 1992; 2 × VHS	March 1993	March 1993; 2 × VHS
The Colin Baker Years	—N/a	March 1994	April 1994	August 1994
More Than Thirty Years in the TARDIS	—N/a	November 1994	March 1995	September 1995
The Curse of Fatal Death	1 × 20 min.	September 1999	October 1999	October 2000

There have also been several releases which collect together related stories and were exclusively available in these sets:

- Dalek Tin Set #1 - This release contained The Chase and Remembrance of the Daleks, and was released in September 1993
- Dalek Tin Set #2 - This release contained Planet of the Daleks and Revelation of the Daleks and was released in November 1999
- Cyberman Tin Set - This release contained The Tenth Planet and Attack of the Cybermen and was released in November 2000
- The Master Tin Set - This release contained Colony in Space and The Time Monster and was released in November 2001

Other releases have been made available which collected together previously released individual stories:

- The Davros Collection - This release contained all five stories featuring Davros; Genesis of the Daleks, Destiny of the Daleks, Resurrection of the Daleks, Revelation of the Daleks and Remembrance of the Daleks. It was released in September 2001 and was exclusive to W.H. Smiths.
- The Time Lord Collection - This release contained The War Games, The Three Doctors and The Deadly Assassin. It was released in September 2002 and was exclusive to W.H. Smiths.
- The End of the Universe Collection - This release was exclusive to the US market to celebrate the 40th anniversary and contained the last 13 stories yet to be released on VHS. These were The Sensorites, The Reign of Terror, The Time Meddler. The Gunfighters, The Faceless Ones, The Web of Fear, The Ambassadors of Death, The Mutants, Invasion of the Dinosaurs, The Invisible Enemy, The Creature from the Pit, The Horns of Nimon and Meglos. It was released in October 2003.

== Betamax releases ==
Releases on the Betamax format

=== Second Doctor ===
Season	Story no.	Serial name	Duration	Release date		
Season	Story no.	Serial name	Duration	UK	Australia	USA / Canada
6	48	The Seeds of Death	1 × 150 min.	July 1985	—N/a	—N/a

=== Third Doctor ===
Season	Story no.	Serial name	Duration	Release date		
Season	Story no.	Serial name	Duration	UK	Australia	USA / Canada
9	60	Day of the Daleks	1 × 100 min.	July 1986	—N/a	—N/a

=== Fourth Doctor ===
Season	Story no.	Serial name	Duration	Release date		
Season	Story no.	Serial name	Duration	UK	Australia	USA / Canada
12	79	Revenge of the Cybermen	1 × 100 min.	October 1983	—N/a	—N/a
13	82	Pyramids of Mars	1 × 100 min.	February 1985	—N/a	—N/a
13	84	The Brain of Morbius	1 × 60 min.	July 1984	—N/a	—N/a
14	90	The Robots of Death	1 × 100 min	April 1986	—N/a	—N/a

=== Fifth Doctor ===
Season	Story no.	Serial name	Duration	Release date		
Season	Story no.	Serial name	Duration	UK	Australia	USA / Canada
20	129	"The Five Doctors"	1 × 90 min.	September 1985	—N/a	—N/a

== Laserdisc releases ==
Between 1983 and 1997 eight LaserDiscs containing one story of the Third Doctor, four stories from the Fourth Doctor, one story from the Fifth Doctor and one story from the Eighth Doctor have been released. These discs are only playable on LaserDisc players.

=== Third Doctor ===
Season	Story no.	Serial name	Duration	Release date		
Season	Story no.	Serial name	Duration	UK	Australia	USA / Canada
9	60	Day of the Daleks	4 × 25 min. (UK)	December 1996	—N/a	—N/a
9	60	Day of the Daleks	1 × 89 min. (US movie compilation)	—N/a	January 1992	—N/a

=== Fourth Doctor ===
Season	Story no.	Serial name	Duration	Release date		
Season	Story no.	Serial name	Duration	UK	Australia	USA / Canada
12	76	The Ark in Space	4 × 25 min.	October 1996	—N/a	—N/a
12	79	Revenge of the Cybermen (edited)	1 × 92 min.	December 1983	—N/a	—N/a
13	80	Terror of the Zygons	4 × 25 min.	December 1997	—N/a	—N/a
13	84	The Brain of Morbius (edited)	1 × 60 min.	July 1984	—N/a	—N/a

=== Fifth Doctor ===
Season	Story no.	Serial name	Duration	Release date		
Season	Story no.	Serial name	Duration	UK	Australia	USA / Canada
20	130	"The Five Doctors"	1 × 90 min.	—N/a	—N/a	24 August 1994

=== Eighth Doctor ===
Season	Story no.	Serial name	Duration	Release date		
Season	Story no.	Serial name	Duration	UK	Hong Kong	USA / Canada
—	156	Doctor Who: The Movie	1 × 85 min.	—N/a	January 1997	—N/a

== Video 2000 releases ==
Releases on the Video 2000 format.

=== Fourth Doctor ===
Season	Story no.	Serial name	Duration	Release date		
Season	Story no.	Serial name	Duration	UK	Australia	USA / Canada
12	79	Revenge of the Cybermen	1 × 100 min.	October 1983	—N/a	—N/a
13	84	The Brain of Morbius	1 × 60 min.	July 1984	—N/a	—N/a

== UMD releases ==
In 2005, series 1 of Doctor Who was released on Universal Media Disc (UMD) format in four parts. The first part of series 4 also received a UMD release in 2009. They are only playable on Sony's PlayStation Portable and have no region locking. The releases were ultimately discontinued due to disappointing sales.

=== Ninth Doctor ===
series	Story no.	Episode name	Duration	Release date		
series	Story no.	Episode name	Duration	UK	Australia	USA / Canada
1	157–159	"Rose" "End of the World" "The Unquiet Dead"	3 × 45 min.	12 December 2005	4 July 2006	—N/a
1	160–161	"Aliens of London" "World War Three" "Dalek"	3 × 45 min.	17 October 2005	4 July 2006	—N/a
1	162–164	"The Long Game" "Father's Day" "The Empty Child" "The Doctor Dances"	4 × 45 min. (Note: The only UMD release to be split across two discs, as it contains four episodes instead of the usual three.)	26 December 2005	4 July 2006	—N/a
1	165–166	"Boom Town" "Bad Wolf" "The Parting of the Ways"	3 × 45 min.	26 December 2005	4 July 2006	—N/a

=== Tenth Doctor ===
Series	Story no.	Episode name	Duration	Release date		
Series	Story no.	Episode name	Duration	UK	Australia	USA / Canada
4	189–191	"Partners in Crime" "The Fires of Pompeii" "Planet of the Ood"	3 × 45 min.	April 2009	—N/a	—N/a

== See also ==
- List of Doctor Who home video releases
- Lists of Doctor Who episodes
- Doctor Who missing episodes
- Doctor Who Restoration Team

== Bibliography ==
- Ainsworth, John, ed. (2015). "100,000 BC and The Mutants (aka The Daleks)". Doctor Who: The Complete History. 1 (4). Panini Comics, Hachette Partworks.
- Ainsworth, John, ed. (2016a). "Inside the Spaceship, Marco Polo, The Keys of Marinus and The Aztecs". Doctor Who: The Complete History. 2 (32). Panini Comics, Hachette Partworks.
- Ainsworth, John, ed. (2016b). "The Crusade, The Space Museum, The Chase and The Time Meddler". Doctor Who: The Complete History. 5 (11). London: Panini Comics, Hachette Partworks. ISSN 2057-6048.
- Wright, Mark, ed. (2016). "The Sensorites, The Reign of Terror and Planet of Giants". Doctor Who: The Complete History. 3 (21). Panini Comics, Hachette Partworks.
- Wright, Mark, ed. (2017). "The Dalek Invasion of Earth, The Rescue, The Romans and The Web Planet". Doctor Who: The Complete History. 4 (61). London: Panini Comics, Hachette Partworks. ISSN 2057-6048.
