= Alec Wallis =

British actor (1920–2004)

- Born: Alexander Crichton Wallis; 2 December 1920; Lewisham, London, England
- Died: 12 August 2004 (aged 83); Haywards Heath, West Sussex, England
- Occupation: Actor

Alec Wallis (2 December 1920 – 12 August 2004) was a British actor, who was often cast in television productions by director Michael E. Briant.

He took an interest in theatre when serving in the Forces overseas. On his demobilisation, he spent a year at a dramatic school before joining the Amersham Repertory Company being part of Caryl Jenner's Mobile Theatre, touring the country in various productions. Other engagements included performances in Lincoln, Sheringham, and on tour with the Royal Shakespeare Company.

On TV, Wallis appeared in two serials of the British science fiction television series Doctor Who: in 1972, he played Ldg. Telegraphist Bowman in The Sea Devils; and in 1975, he played Warner in Revenge of the Cybermen - both for Briant. Other roles include Sykes and a..., R3, Theatre 625, Z-Cars, Thirty-Minute Theatre, Softly, Softly: Task Force, Colditz, Warship, Within These Walls, Dixon of Dock Green, Treasure Island, Secret Army, The Gentle Touch, First of the Summer Wine, Grange Hill, The Bill, 2point4 Children and London's Burning.
