= Doctor Who season 9 =

1972 season of British sci-fi TV series

Doctor Who
- Season 9
- Cover art of the Blu-ray release for the complete season
- Starring: Jon Pertwee; Katy Manning; Nicholas Courtney; John Levene; Richard Franklin
- No. of stories: 5
- No. of episodes: 26

Release
- Original network: BBC1
- Original release: 1 January – 24 June 1972

Season chronology
- ← Previous; Season 8 Next → Season 10

The ninth season of British science fiction television series Doctor Who began on 1 January 1972 with Day of the Daleks, and ended with The Time Monster. This is the third series of the Third Doctor, played by Jon Pertwee, as well as the third to be produced by Barry Letts and script edited by Terrance Dicks.

== Casting ==
=== Main cast ===
- Jon Pertwee as the Third Doctor
- Katy Manning as Jo Grant

Jon Pertwee continues his role as the Third Doctor, as does Katy Manning playing Jo Grant.

=== Recurring cast ===
- Nicholas Courtney as Brigadier Lethbridge-Stewart
- John Levene as Sergeant Benton
- Richard Franklin as Mike Yates
- Roger Delgado as The Master

Nicholas Courtney, John Levene and Richard Franklin continue their roles of Brigadier Lethbridge-Stewart, Sergeant Benton and Captain Mike Yates respectively.

Roger Delgado returns to play The Master in The Sea Devils and The Time Monster.

=== Guest stars ===
Alan Bennion makes his second of three appearances in the series playing an Ice Warrior, portraying Lord Izlyr in The Curse of Peladon and Valentine Palmer plays Monia in episodes 3 and 4. Geoffrey Palmer makes an appearance as the Administrator in The Mutants, and Hammer actress Ingrid Pitt played Queen Galleia in The Time Monster.

== Development ==
Several stories were scrapped from this season. Two stories by Brian Hayles were scrapped: The Brain-Dead, which would have depicted Ice Warriors using a "Z-Beam" to reduce temperatures across the Earth and turn humans into zombie-like slaves, and The Shape of Terror, which would have seen an alien shape-shifting entity attempting to merge with the Doctor, resulting in its own destruction. The first storyline was rejected, but the Ice Warriors' inclusion inspired their appearance in The Curse of Peladon. Elements of The Shape of Terror would also be reused for The Curse of Peladon. Robert Sloman was initially commissioned to write a serial titled The Daleks in London, which would have reintroduced the Daleks to the series, though was scrapped in favor of Day of the Daleks. The Mega, written by Bill Strutton, was also scrapped.

== Serials ==
The first serial, Day of the Daleks, saw the return of the Daleks for the first time since Season 4's The Evil of the Daleks in 1967. This was also the first time that the Daleks had been seen in colour in the television series (they had been in colour in the two films starring Peter Cushing produced in the mid-1960s).

No. story	No. in season	Serial title	Episode titles	Directed by	Written by	Original release date	Prod. code	UK viewers (millions)	AI
60	1	Day of the Daleks	"Episode One"	Paul Bernard	Louis Marks	1 January 1972	KKK	9.8	—
60	1	Day of the Daleks	"Episode Two"	Paul Bernard	Louis Marks	8 January 1972	KKK	10.4	—
60	1	Day of the Daleks	"Episode Three"	Paul Bernard	Louis Marks	15 January 1972	KKK	9.1	—
60	1	Day of the Daleks	"Episode Four"	Paul Bernard	Louis Marks	22 January 1972	KKK	9.1	—
Rebels from a future Earth conquered by the Daleks travel to the 20th Century to change the course of history.
61	2	The Curse of Peladon	"Episode One"	Lennie Mayne	Brian Hayles	29 January 1972	MMM	10.3	—
61	2	The Curse of Peladon	"Episode Two"	Lennie Mayne	Brian Hayles	5 February 1972	MMM	11.0	—
61	2	The Curse of Peladon	"Episode Three"	Lennie Mayne	Brian Hayles	12 February 1972	MMM	7.8	—
61	2	The Curse of Peladon	"Episode Four"	Lennie Mayne	Brian Hayles	19 February 1972	MMM	8.4	—
A high priest on the planet Peladon warns a curse will fall on the planet if it joins the Galactic Federation.
62	3	The Sea Devils	"Episode One"	Michael E. Briant	Malcolm Hulke	26 February 1972	LLL	6.4	—
62	3	The Sea Devils	"Episode Two"	Michael E. Briant	Malcolm Hulke	4 March 1972	LLL	9.7	—
62	3	The Sea Devils	"Episode Three"	Michael E. Briant	Malcolm Hulke	11 March 1972	LLL	8.3	—
62	3	The Sea Devils	"Episode Four"	Michael E. Briant	Malcolm Hulke	18 March 1972	LLL	7.8	—
62	3	The Sea Devils	"Episode Five"	Michael E. Briant	Malcolm Hulke	25 March 1972	LLL	8.3	—
62	3	The Sea Devils	"Episode Six"	Michael E. Briant	Malcolm Hulke	1 April 1972	LLL	8.5	—
The Master allies with the Sea Devils to conquer Earth.
63	4	The Mutants	"Episode One"	Christopher Barry	Bob Baker and Dave Martin	8 April 1972	NNN	9.1	—
63	4	The Mutants	"Episode Two"	Christopher Barry	Bob Baker and Dave Martin	15 April 1972	NNN	7.8	—
63	4	The Mutants	"Episode Three"	Christopher Barry	Bob Baker and Dave Martin	22 April 1972	NNN	7.9	—
63	4	The Mutants	"Episode Four"	Christopher Barry	Bob Baker and Dave Martin	29 April 1972	NNN	7.5	—
63	4	The Mutants	"Episode Five"	Christopher Barry	Bob Baker and Dave Martin	6 May 1972	NNN	7.9	—
63	4	The Mutants	"Episode Six"	Christopher Barry	Bob Baker and Dave Martin	13 May 1972	NNN	6.5	—
A despotic marshal wishes to wipe out the native population of the human colony Solos and make the planet habitable for humanity.
64	5	The Time Monster	"Episode One"	Paul Bernard	Robert Sloman and Barry Letts (uncredited)	20 May 1972	OOO	7.6	—
64	5	The Time Monster	"Episode Two"	Paul Bernard	Robert Sloman and Barry Letts (uncredited)	27 May 1972	OOO	7.4	—
64	5	The Time Monster	"Episode Three"	Paul Bernard	Robert Sloman and Barry Letts (uncredited)	3 June 1972	OOO	8.1	—
64	5	The Time Monster	"Episode Four"	Paul Bernard	Robert Sloman and Barry Letts (uncredited)	10 June 1972	OOO	7.6	—
64	5	The Time Monster	"Episode Five"	Paul Bernard	Robert Sloman and Barry Letts (uncredited)	17 June 1972	OOO	6.0	—
64	5	The Time Monster	"Episode Six"	Paul Bernard	Robert Sloman and Barry Letts (uncredited)	24 June 1972	OOO	7.6	—
The Master experiments on a special crystal to summon Kronos, a creature from outside time and space.

== Broadcast ==
The entire season was broadcast from 1 January to 24 June 1972.

== Home media ==
=== VHS releases ===
Season	Story no.	Serial name	Duration	Release date		
Season	Story no.	Serial name	Duration	UK	Australia	USA / Canada
9	60	Day of the Daleks	1 × 100 min.	February 1988	January 1987	March 1989
9	60	Day of the Daleks	4 × 25 min.	April 1994	—N/a	—N/a
9	61	The Curse of Peladon	4 × 25 min.	2 August 1993	November 1993	September 1995
9	62	The Sea Devils	6 × 25 min.	September 1995 (2 × VHS)	July 1996	May 1997 (2 × VHS)
9	63	The Mutants	6 × 25 min.	February 2003	May 2003	October 2003
9	64	The Time Monster	6 × 25 min.	November 2001 (Note: 2 × VHS released as part of a box set "Colony in Space / The Time Monster")	December 2001	January 2003

=== Betamax releases ===
Season	Story no.	Serial name	Duration	Release date		
Season	Story no.	Serial name	Duration	UK	Australia	USA / Canada
9	60	Day of the Daleks	1 × 100 min.	July 1986	—N/a	—N/a

=== Laserdisc releases ===
Season	Story no.	Serial name	Duration	Release date		
Season	Story no.	Serial name	Duration	UK	Australia	USA / Canada
9	60	Day of the Daleks	4 × 25 min. (UK)	December 1996	—N/a	—N/a
9	60	Day of the Daleks	1 × 89 min. (US movie compilation)	—N/a	January 1992	—N/a

=== DVD and Blu-ray releases ===
All releases are for DVD unless otherwise indicated:

- ^{(B)} indicates a Blu-ray release

Season	Story no.	Serial name	Duration	Release date		
Season	Story no.	Serial name	Duration	R2	R4	R1
9	60	Day of the Daleks	4 × 25 min.	12 September 2011	6 October 2011	13 September 2011
9	61	The Curse of Peladon (Note: Only available as part of the Peladon Tales box set in Regions 2 and 4. Only available individually in Region 1.)	4 × 25 min.	18 January 2010	4 March 2010	4 May 2010
9	62	The Sea Devils (Note: Only available as part of the Beneath the Surface box set in Regions 2 and 4. Available individually or in the box set in Region 1.)	6 × 25 min.	14 January 2008	5 March 2008	3 June 2008
9	63	The Mutants	6 × 25 min.	31 January 2011	3 February 2011	8 February 2011
9	64	The Time Monster (Note: Only available as part of the Myths and Legends box set in Regions 2 and 4. Only available individually in Region 1.)	6 × 25 min.	29 March 2010	3 June 2010	6 July 2010
9	60–64	Complete Season 9 (Note: Released as Doctor Who: The Collection – Season 9 in Region B. Released as Doctor Who – Jon Pertwee: Complete Season Three in Region A.)	26 × 25 min.	20 March 2023 ^{(B)}	23 August 2023 ^{(B)}	11 July 2023 ^{(B)}

== In print ==
Season	Story no.	Library no. (Note: Number in Target's Doctor Who Library, if applicable)	Novelisation title	Author	Hardcover release date (Note: Published by Target's parent companies (Allen Wingate, W. H. Allen, BBC Books) unless otherwise indicated)	Paperback release date (Note: Published by Target Books (or by BBC Books under the Target Collection umbrella) unless otherwise indicated)	Audiobook	
Season	Story no.	Library no.	Novelisation title	Author	Hardcover release date	Paperback release date	Release date (Note: Unabridged from BBC Audio / AudioGo unless otherwise indicated)	Narrator
9	060	18	Doctor Who and the Day of the Daleks	Terrance Dicks	20 August 1981	18 March 1974	3 November 2016	Richard Franklin (Note: Dalek voices performed by Nicholas Briggs)
9	061	13	Doctor Who and the Curse of Peladon	Brian Hayles	17 July 1980	16 January 1975	3 July 1995 (Note: Abridged)	Jon Pertwee
9	061	13	Doctor Who and the Curse of Peladon	Brian Hayles	17 July 1980	16 January 1975	2 May 2013	David Troughton
9	062	54	Doctor Who and the Sea-Devils	Malcolm Hulke	18 June 1981	17 October 1974	7 June 2012	Geoffrey Beevers
9	063	44	Doctor Who and the Mutants	Terrance Dicks	29 September 1977		4 October 2018	Jon Culshaw
9	064	102	The Time Monster	Terrance Dicks	12 September 1985	13 February 1986	16 March 2023	Jon Culshaw

== Bibliography ==
- Smith, Paul (2014). The Classic Doctor Who DVD Compendium. United Kingdom: Wonderful Books. ISBN 978-0-9576062-2-7.
- Smith, Paul MC (July 2021). Based on the Popular BBC Television Serial. Wonderful Books.
- Howe, David J.; Stammers, Mark; Walker, Stephen James (1994). Doctor Who – The Seventies. London: Virgin Press. ISBN 1-85227-444-1..
