= The Time Monster =

064 – The Time Monster
- Doctor Who serial

Cast
- Doctor: Jon Pertwee – Third Doctor
- Companion: Katy Manning – Jo Grant
- Others: Nicholas Courtney – Brigadier Lethbridge-Stewart; Richard Franklin – Captain Mike Yates; John Levene – Sergeant Benton; Roger Delgado – The Master; Marc Boyle – Kronos; Ingrid Bower – Face of Kronos; Ian Collier – Stuart Hyde; Wanda Moore – Dr. Ruth Ingram; Donald Eccles – Krasis; Ingrid Pitt – Queen Galleia; George Cormack – King Dalios; Susan Penhaligon – Lakis; Aidan Murphy – Hippias; John Wyse – Dr. Percival; Neville Barber – Dr. Cook; Barry Ashton – Proctor; Terry Walsh – Window Cleaner; George Lee – Farmworker; Simon Legree – UNIT Sergeant; Gregory Powell – Knight; Dave Carter – Roundhead Officer; Derek Murcott – Crito; Michael Walker – Miseus; Dave Prowse – Minotaur; Melville Jones – Guard; Keith Dalton – Neophite; Darren Plant – Baby Benton (uncredited)

Production
- Directed by: Paul Bernard
- Written by: Robert Sloman, Barry Letts (uncredited)
- Script editor: Terrance Dicks
- Produced by: Barry Letts
- Executive producer: None
- Music by: Dudley Simpson
- Production code: OOO
- Series: Season 9
- Running time: 6 episodes, 25 minutes each
- First broadcast: 20 May 1972
- Last broadcast: 24 June 1972

Chronology
← Preceded by The Mutants	Followed by → The Three Doctors

The Time Monster is the fifth and final serial of the ninth season of the British science fiction television series Doctor Who, which was first broadcast in six weekly parts on BBC1 from 20 May to 24 June 1972.

The serial is set in a village near Cambridge as well as the mythical city of Atlantis. In the serial, the alien time traveller the Master (Roger Delgado) seeks the power of Kronos (Marc Boyle and Ingrid Bower), a being that exists outside of time and space, so that he can control the universe.

== Plot ==
The Master, posing as a professor, gains access to a physical science research unit in the village of Wootton, near Cambridge. He conducts time experiments focused around transmitting matter by breaking it down into light waves. He is particularly interested in examining a trident-shaped crystal in his possession, using it to attract a being he addresses as Kronos.

The Third Doctor and Jo Grant visit the institute, following his hunch (via a dream he had about a crystal) that the Master is back on Earth with his TARDIS. The experiments disrupt the normal flow of time and in one instance, Hyde, a researcher, is caught in the field of the experiment, and ages to more than eighty years. Brigadier Lethbridge-Stewart has the project evacuated and begins a hunt for the Master. The Doctor explains that Kronos is a "chronovore", a creature from outside time that feeds on it, attracted from the vortex to ancient Atlantis using a crystal trident larger than one seen to have been used by the Master. The Doctor suspects capturing the chronovore is the Master's purpose, and that this represents a danger to the entire universe.

Meanwhile, the Atlantean High Priest of Poseidon, Krasis, is transported through interstitial time by the Master and brought to an office at the institute. The Master seizes the Seal of Kronos from the priest and uses it to conjure Kronos, a white, bird-like figure, who devours the Institute's Director, Dr Percival. Kronos is briefly contained by the Master, but breaks free, Krasis surmising the Master only has the smaller fragment of the original crystal.

The Doctor and his allies, alerted by the Master's actions, build a time flow analogue to interrupt the experiments. The Time Lords then duel using time as a weapon, leading to a series of bizarre temporal effects. When they pit their TARDISes against one another, the Doctor is ejected into the vortex, but survives thanks to Jo and his TARDIS.

In ancient Atlantis, King Dalios is troubled by the disappearance of Krasis and the threat to the Kronos crystal, which is guarded by the Minotaur at the heart of a maze. The Master has travelled to Atlantis in search of the crystal and soon inveigles himself at court, wooing Queen Galleia. When the Doctor and Jo arrive, the unnaturally long-lived King confides that Atlantis turned from Kronos and sought to end the link by which the chronovore could be controlled by destroying the crystal, but they could only splinter it. The Doctor then faces the Minotaur to rescue Jo, duped into the maze by Krasis, and the creature is destroyed. The crystal is now produced from the maze – but the Master's schemes have borne fruit and he has usurped the throne. Jo and the Doctor are soon detained and witness Dalios' death after being smitten with a trident.

Krasis uses the crystal to summon Kronos to Atlantis once more. The enraged chronovore begins to destroy Atlantis while the Master flees in his TARDIS, with Jo Grant in tow. The Doctor heads off in his own TARDIS in pursuit while Kronos destroys the city and people of Atlantis. In the vortex, the Doctor threatens the mutually assured destruction of both TARDISes by a "time ram" in which both vehicles would occupy the same space/time co-ordinates. The Master calls his bluff, on behalf of Jo is unable to until she carries the threat out. In a resulting temporal void, a thankful Kronos is set free, saving the Doctor and Jo and returning them to their TARDIS. On the Doctor's insistence, the Master is spared from torment by Kronos, but he flees in his own TARDIS before he can be apprehended. The Doctor and Jo return to the institute, where normality is returning, through a final use of the Master's machine, which now overloads, and the time experiments end.

== Production ==
According to the comprehensive production documentation released in 2023 as part of the 'Season 9 Blu Ray Collection', when Sloman was commissioned to write the final six part story for the season in May 1971, it was titled "The Daleks in London". By December 1971, the idea had been abandoned (the Dalek story for the season instead was the premiere with Day of the Daleks) and Sloman's contract was amended to write "The Time Monster".

Location filming for the Newton Institute took place at Swallowfield Park in Berkshire, with additional scenes shot in Stratfield Saye Park in Hampshire.

This story sees a redesign of the TARDIS interior. Producer Barry Letts was unhappy with the redesign. The set was damaged shortly after recording on this particular serial wrapped and, as a result, was discarded.

Although the PAL mastertapes had been wiped, NTSC copies were returned to the BBC from TVOntario in Canada in 1983. In 1987, a low-band 625-line monochrome tape of Episode Six was discovered at the BBC. It was recoloured by combining the black-and-white picture with the 525-line colour signal of the episode, creating a superior copy to the NTSC one.

=== Cast notes ===
George Cormack also played K'anpo in Planet of the Spiders (1974). Ingrid Pitt later played Solow in Warriors of the Deep (1984). Ian Collier returned to play Omega in Arc of Infinity (1983) and appeared in the audio play Excelis Decays. Susan Penhaligon played Shayla in the audio play Primeval and Neville Barber played Howard Baker in K9 and Company. David Prowse would later achieve worldwide fame as Darth Vader in the original Star Wars trilogy beginning in 1977.

== Broadcast and reception ==
Episode	Title	Run time	Original release date	UK viewers (millions)	Archive
1	"Episode One"	25:04	20 May 1972	7.6	RSC converted (NTSC-to-PAL)
2	"Episode Two"	25:05	27 May 1972	7.4	RSC converted (NTSC-to-PAL)
3	"Episode Three"	23:59	3 June 1972	8.1	RSC converted (NTSC-to-PAL)
4	"Episode Four"	23:55	10 June 1972	7.6	RSC converted (NTSC-to-PAL)
5	"Episode Five"	24:29	17 June 1972	6.0	RSC converted (NTSC-to-PAL)
6	"Episode Six"	24:55	24 June 1972	7.6	PAL 2" restored colour videotape

Paul Cornell, Martin Day and Keith Topping gave the serial an unfavourable review in The Discontinuity Guide (1995), describing watching it as being like "watching paint dry while being whipped with barbed wire". In 2010, Mark Braxton of Radio Times felt that the serial teetered between "delightful" absurdity and "outright, galloping stupidity, and sadly it tips too often into the latter." While he praised the realisation of Atlantis and the Doctor and Jo, he wrote that many poor decisions were made in production and "any drama just dribbles away". DVD Talk's Stuart Galbraith gave The Time Monster two out of five stars, finding problems in the plot structure and Kronos. In 2010, SFX named the scene where the Doctor balances ordinary objects to counter TOMTIT as one of the silliest moments in Doctor Who's history.

== Commercial releases ==
=== In print ===
The Time Monster
- Author: Terrance Dicks
- Cover artist: Andrew Skilleter
- Series: Doctor Who book: Target novelisations
- Release number: 102
- Publisher: Target Books
- Publication date: 13 February 1986
- ISBN: 0-491-03870-4

A novelisation of this serial, written by Terrance Dicks, was published in hardback by Target Books in September 1985, and in paperback in February 1986. It was reprinted again as part of Target's Doctor Who Classics range back-to-back to Barry Letts' novelisation of The Dæmons and bound in a metallic cover.

=== Home media ===
This story was released with Colony in Space in a VHS tin box set, The Master, in 2001. As of 5 August 2008, this serial has been offered for sale on iTunes. The Time Monster was released on 29 March 2010 in a Region 2 DVD box set named "Myths and Legends" along with Underworld and The Horns of Nimon. It was released as a stand-alone disc in Region 1 on 6 July 2010. In March 2023, the story was released again in an upgraded format for Blu-ray, being included with the four other stories from Season 9 in the Doctor Who - The Collection Box Set.
