= Treasure Island (1977 TV series) =

1977 British children's TV series

- DVD cover
- Based on: Treasure Island by Robert Louis Stevenson
- Screenplay by: John Lucarotti
- Directed by: Michael E. Briant
- Starring: Alfred Burke; Ashley Knight; Jack Watson; David Collings; Anthony Bate; Thorley Walters; Roy Boyd; Patrick Troughton; Paul Copley
- Composer: Carl Davis
- Countries of origin: United Kingdom; United States
- Original language: English
- No. of episodes: 4

Original release
- Release: 16 October – 6 November 1977

Treasure Island is a 1977 television adaptation of Robert Louis Stevenson's 1883 novel. It was filmed in 1977 on location in Plymouth and Dartmouth (Devon), and in Corsica, and also at BBC Television Centre at Wood Lane, London. John Lucarotti wrote the four-episode adaptation, and Michael E. Briant directed.

== Plot ==
Jim Hawkins discovers a treasure map and embarks on a journey to find the treasure, but pirates led by Long John Silver have plans to take the treasure for themselves by way of mutiny. Lucarotti's adaptation, while particularly faithful to the original, adds an expanded narrative concerning the declining Daniel Hawkins, as well as clarifying Squire Trelawney's naiveté in trusting Blandly and Silver.

This takes place in the first episode; Billy Bones tempts Jim's father into arranging a two-man treasure voyage, the corrupt shipping agent Ezra Blandly guesses their intentions and tips off Silver, who hoodwinks and then cruelly tortures the information out of a hapless alcoholic Mr Arrow. Billy Bones' plans founder, and the elder Hawkins catches pneumonia in the rain, which finishes him.

== Cast ==
- Alfred Burke as Long John Silver
- Ashley Knight as Jim Hawkins
- Jack Watson as Capt. Billy Bones
- David Collings as Blind Pew
- Thorley Walters as Squire John Trelawney
- Anthony Bate as Dr. David Livesey
- Roy Boyd as George Merry
- Patrick Troughton as Israel Hands
- Stephen Greif as Job Anderson
- Talfryn Thomas as Tom Morgan
- Paul Copley as Ben Gunn
- Tim Condren as Seamus O'Brien
- Richard Beale as Capt. Alexander Smollett
- Roy Evans as Richard Joyce
- Brian Croucher as John Hunter
- Royston Tickner as Tom Redruth
- Edward Peel as Abraham Grey
- Jo Kendall as Sarah Hawkins
- Terry Scully as Daniel Hawkins
- Christopher Burgess as Black Dog
- Ena Cabayo as Louisa Silver
- Stephen Boswell as Dick Johnson
- John Baskcomb as Ezra Blandly
- Keith Bartlett as John
- Max Faulkner as Sgt. Dance
- Linal Haft as Joshua Arrow
- Henry Knowles as Bill
- Derrick Slater as Tom
- Clive Wood as Dirk
- John Dearth as Jeb
