= The Wild and the Willing =

1962 British film by Ralph Thomas

- Directed by: Ralph Thomas
- Written by: Nicholas Phipps; Mordecai Richler
- Based on: play "The Tinker" by Laurence Doble and Robert Sloman
- Produced by: Betty E. Box executive Earl St. John
- Starring: Virginia Maskell; Paul Rogers; Ian McShane; Samantha Eggar; John Hurt
- Cinematography: Ernest Steward
- Edited by: Alfred Roome
- Music by: Norrie Paramor
- Production companies: Betty E. Box-Ralph Thomas Productions; Rank Organisation
- Distributed by: J. Arthur Rank Film Distributors (UK)
- Release date: 16 October 1962 (London)
- Running time: 110 minutes
- Country: United Kingdom
- Language: English

The Wild and the Willing (also known as Young and Willing) is a 1962 British romantic drama film, directed by Ralph Thomas and starring Virginia Maskell, Paul Rogers, Ian McShane and Samantha Eggar. It is the film debuts of Ian McShane, John Hurt, and Samantha Eggar. It was written by Nicholas Phipps and Mordecai Richler based on the 1960 play The Tinker by Laurence Doble and Robert Sloman.

It depicts a group of students at university.

== Plot ==
A group of young men at university enjoy students' life – dancing, drinking, meeting girls. Harry, a somewhat rebellious young man, is going out with Josie. His roommate, Phil, is a quiet outsider. Harry feels very protective towards Phil for some reason. Phil loves Sarah, but she has jilted him for a new boyfriend, who is in her opinion more suitable.

As the plot develops, Harry gets involved with Professor Chown's unhappy wife, Virginia. The professor acts very aloofly towards her but doesn't want a divorce because he is expecting to be knighted. Harry wants Virginia to come away with him but she is too worried about her future and turns him down.

Because of frustration Harry decides to pull a "Rag Week" (annual student frolics) stunt. His idea is to climb the campus tower at night and raise a flag atop it. He needs help to pull this off but all the other young men opt out for various reasons. Phil offers to join Harry. He feels that Harry has done a lot to get him involved in campus life, rather than just living on the fringes. At first, Harry, worried about the consequences as Phil is not a good climber, refuses to take Phil along with him, but eventually, against his better judgment, he is persuaded to do so.

Gilby, a smart striver, is jealous of Harry; he used to see Virginia until she rejected him. He notices the activities around the tower and reports Harry and Phil to the university authorities. The teachers are more annoyed than worried and call the fire brigade. The spectacle draws a crowd. Although Phil is a bad climber and slips several times, the two young men manage to reach the top and hoist their flag. But on the way down Phil loses his footing and, although Harry tries desperately to hold on to him, Phil slips from his grasp and falls to his death.

Harry is expelled ("sent down" from the university. At a final visit to Professor Chown and his wife, the Professor admits that Harry's paper was brilliant and that due to his stunt, he has forfeited a scholarship and an academic career. Josie meets Harry at the bus station and realises that she doesn't mean much to him. Yet she asks him to take her along, but he refuses. He doesn't want to go on hurting people. The film ends with Reggie, an African friend, singing a ballad about Harry and Josie.

== Cast ==
- Virginia Maskell as Virginia Chown
- Paul Rogers as Professor George Chown
- Ian McShane as Harry Brown
- Samantha Eggar as Josie Stevens
- Catherine Woodville as Sarah
- David Sumner as John
- John Hurt as Phil Corbett
- John Standing as Arthur
- Johnny Briggs as Dai
- Johnny Sekka as Reggie
- Jeremy Brett as Andrew Gilby
- Charles Kay as Edgar Tibbs
- John Barrie as Mr Corbett
- Megs Jenkins as Mrs Corbett
- Victor Brooks as Fire Chief
- Ernest Clark as Vice-Chancellor
- Denise Coffey as Jane
- George A. Cooper as first customer
- Richard Leech as Police Inspector
- Harry Locke as second customer
- Marianne Stone as Clara
- Richard Warner as coroner
- John Welsh as publican
- Jeremy Young as policeman

== Production ==
It was filmed on location in Lincoln, with Lincoln Castle doubling as the university. Filming started 24 April 1961.

It was the first feature film for Samantha Eggar, John Hurt and Ian McShane. Betty Box says Hurt was the first cast; they used him to audition other actors. McShane was only months from graduating from the Royal Academy of Dramatic Art when asked to audition. "It's very appealing, movie money, so I did it and that was that", said McShane later.

== Reception ==
Betty Box said the film "didn't break records or win awards but it did reasonably good business and put the youngsters on the first rung of the ladder to stardom."

=== Critical reception ===
The Monthly Film Bulletin wrote: "One doesn't doubt the film's good intentions: the seeking out of a promising location, with Lincoln standing in for redbrick provincialism; the use of an eager and largely untried team of young actors (among whom John Hurt and Samantha Eggar show the most promise); the resolute excursions into the 'X' certificate dialogue, pub scenes and bedroom scenes which have helped to equate this kind of realism with box-office. But the film, from Virginia Maskell's frustrated don's wife, swigging whisky out of the bottle and seducing her husband's students in the kitchen, to the extravagantly self-conscious heartiness of the roistering in pubs, looks either slightly off-key or hilariously so. Harry may have seemed a plausible character in the original play; here he becomes a walking compendium of jaded Angry Young Man attitudes, while the film leans so far backwards in its determination to integrate Reggie, the coloured student, into the group that it achieves a kind of desperate self-consciousness about him. ...Ralph Thomas directs in a manner more restless than brisk; but the restlessness is hardly that of urgent youth."

In the Radio Times, David McGillivray wrote, "an unsuccessful play, The Tinker – written when Angry Young Men were in vogue – is the source of this exposé of British student life. Once shocking, it has aged as badly as others of its ilk, but now has considerable curiosity value, not least because of early appearances by Ian McShane, Samantha Eggar, John Hurt and others. McShane shines as the scholarship boy who vents his wrath on privileged society".

BFI Screenonline referred to the film as "Ralph Thomas's tepid student drama."

Sky Movies concluded the film "still manages to generate moments of high excitement – none more so than a climatic climb up the sheer side of a crumbling steeple – a few minutes that are guaranteed to have you on the edge of your chair."

Filmink wrote "The film feels like Box and Thomas’ attempt to join in on the British new wave, with much angst and bed hopping, but it doesn’t work – we think that maybe the filmmakers were too upbeat and happy people to relate to their characters for this one. The casting was however first rate."

The film was released in the United States in 1964 as Young and Willing. The New York Times called the film "sophomoric".

Ian McShane's performance was described by Tara Brady in the Irish Times as "the archetypal angry young man."
