= Robert Sloman =

British screenwriter and actor (1926–2005)

- Born: 18 July 1926; Oldham, Lancashire, England
- Died: 24 October 2005 (aged 79); South Hams, Devon, England

Robert Sloman (18 July 1926 – 24 October 2005) was an English screenwriter and actor who later worked at The Sunday Times circulation department for more than 20 years, becoming distribution manager; but is best known for his work on British television.

== Early life ==
Sloman was born in Oldham, Lancashire, but his family moved to Plymouth when he was two years old. He gained a degree from the University of Exeter.

== Writing ==
In the early 1970s he made a significant contribution to the science fiction programme Doctor Who on the BBC. Together with then producer Barry Letts, he wrote four stories for the Jon Pertwee era on the programme: The Dæmons (credited as Guy Leopold); The Time Monster; The Green Death; and Planet of the Spiders, which was Pertwee's final serial. The Dæmons was cited by Pertwee as his favourite story, while the others contained strong moral messages, especially the focus on pollution and globalisation in The Green Death. When The Green Death was released on DVD in 2004, Sloman contributed a feature on the writing of the story.

Sloman had also planned to bring the Daleks back at the end of the third Pertwee season, Season 9, in a serial called The Daleks in London. This plan was dropped when the production staff realised that the show would not have a hook for the start of the season to entice viewers, and Sloman's serial was allegedly shaping up to be too similar to The Dalek Invasion of Earth. Instead, writer Louis Marks was asked to alter his serial to include the Daleks – which became Day of the Daleks.

Robert Sloman also co-wrote two plays in the West End, both co-written with Laurence Dobie: The Golden Rivet, and The Tinker; the latter was later turned into a film, The Wild and the Willing, in 1962.
