= Royston Tickner =

British actor (1922–1997)

- Born: Roy Albert Tickner; 8 September 1922; Leicester, Leicestershire, England
- Died: 7 July 1997 (aged 74)
- Occupation: Actor

Roy Albert Tickner (8 September 1922 – 7 July 1997), known professionally as Royston Tickner, was a British film actor.

== Biography ==
Born in Leicester, a tailor's son, he trained as an actor at Scarborough repertory theatre.

He served in the Royal Navy in World War II; however, in 1942 he was touring in the southern English counties, principally in H. F. Maltby's The Rotters with Frank Crawshaw and Preston Lockwood. In the winter of 1942–43 he was stage manager, and took the role of Robert, in the presentation of du Maurier's Rebecca at the Ambassadors Theatre in which Eileen Herlie made her London début, and then toured with the show. In that spring he married Gwendoline Bonde at Leicester. From 1947 he took a break from the theatre to work as a lighthouse keeper, miner, fireman and publican, before returning to acting in 1958.

=== Television roles ===
His television credits include: The Avengers, Z-Cars, Doctor Who (in the serials The Daleks' Master Plan and The Sea Devils), Gideon's Way, The Baron, King of the River, The Troubleshooters, Dixon of Dock Green, Timeslip, The Flaxton Boys, Out of the Unknown, Thorndyke, Emmerdale Farm, Porridge, Last of the Summer Wine, Some Mothers Do 'Ave 'Em, Angels, Return of the Saint, Rogue's Rock, Secret Army, Danger UXB, George and Mildred, The Enigma Files, Kessler, Minder, Reilly, Ace of Spies, Just Good Friends and One by One.

=== Film roles ===
Film roles include Tomescu in Michael Mann's The Keep (1983), and first Colonel in Jim Goddard's Hitler's SS: Portrait in Evil (1985).

== Filmography ==
Year	Title	Role	Notes
1964	Becket	Royal Servant	Uncredited
1966	Morgan – A Suitable Case for Treatment	Workman	Uncredited
1968	Work Is a Four-Letter Word	Train Guard	
1969	All Neat in Black Stockings	Partygoer	Uncredited
1969	Goodbye, Mr. Chips	Policeman	Uncredited
1969	Anne of the Thousand Days	Messenger	Uncredited
1982	Tangier	Ted	
1983	The Keep	Tomescu	
1985	Hitler's SS: Portrait in Evil	Colonel #1	TV movie, (final film role)
