= Ashley Knight =

British actor

- Born: 19 August 1959 (age 66); Sutton, Surrey, England
- Occupations: Actor and Jazz Pianist

Ashley Knight (born 19 August 1959 in Sutton, Surrey, England) is a British actor notable for child roles including Young Claudius in I Claudius; Jim Hawkins in Treasure Island, and Ken in Metal Mickey. His film appearances included roles in To Catch a Spy (1971), Melody (1971) and Warlords of Atlantis (1978).

In 1983, he starred in Summer's Awakening as one of three schoolboy friends spending a holiday in Norfolk following their O-levels.

By August 2009, Knight was appearing at the Liverpool Empire, as Cogsworth the clock in the musical Beauty and the Beast.

He played the role of Louis in I Can't Sing! The X Factor Musical at the London Palladium. The show, written by Harry Hill, closed on 10 May 2014.
