= The Mutants =

063 – The Mutants
- Doctor Who serial

Cast
- Doctor: Jon Pertwee – Third Doctor
- Companion: Katy Manning – Jo Grant
- Others: Paul Whitsun-Jones – The Marshal; George Pravda – Jaeger; Christopher Coll – Stubbs; Rick James – Cotton; James Mellor – Varan; Jonathan Sherwood – Varan's Son; Garrick Hagon – Ky (Note: Also provided the voice of the Skybase One tannoy and communications voice, uncredited.); John Hollis – Sondergaard (Note: Also provided the Hyperion radio voice, uncredited.); Geoffrey Palmer – Administrator; Peter Howell – Investigator; David Arlen – Warrior Guard; Roy Pearce, Damon Sanders, Martin Taylor – Guards; Sidney Johnson – Old Man; John Scott Martin – Mutt

Production
- Directed by: Christopher Barry
- Written by: Bob Baker and Dave Martin
- Script editor: Terrance Dicks
- Produced by: Barry Letts
- Executive producer: None
- Music by: Tristram Cary
- Production code: NNN
- Series: Season 9
- Running time: 6 episodes, 25 minutes each
- First broadcast: 8 April 1972
- Last broadcast: 13 May 1972

Chronology
← Preceded by The Sea Devils	Followed by → The Time Monster

The Mutants is the fourth serial of the ninth season of the British science fiction television series Doctor Who, which was first broadcast in six weekly parts on BBC1 from 8 April to 13 May 1972.

The serial is set on and high above the Earth colony world Solos in the 30th century. In the serial, the Marshal of Solos (Paul Whitsun-Jones) plots to change Solos' atmosphere to make it breathable for humans but not for the native Solonians. At the same time, the alien time traveller the Third Doctor (Jon Pertwee) delivers a set of tablets containing lost information about the Solonians' life cycle to the Solonian Ky (Garrick Hagon).

== Plot ==
In the 30th century, the Earth Empire is contracting and plans are made to decolonise the planet of Solos. The militaristic and bigoted Marshal and other human soldiers, known as Overlords, rule it and the disunionised tribal Solonian people from Skybase One, an orbiting space station. The Marshal opposes the decolonisation plans outlined by an Earth Administrator, and is obsessed with eradicating the arthropod-like mutants or "Mutts" developing on the planet. The Solonians are split between those who actively oppose the occupation, and those who collaborate with the Overlords to eradicate the Mutants, believing them to be a disease. The Marshal and one Solonian, Varan, along with his son, all ensure the Administrator is assassinated before he can confirm Solos' independence. The Third Doctor and Jo arrive on Skybase, the Time Lords having transported the TARDIS there, with a pod which will only open for an intended recipient, which seems to be Ky, another Solonian framed for the Administrator's murder. Ky teleports to the planet's surface, abducting Jo as well.

On Solos, daylight-exposed atmosphere is poisonous to humans. With Ky's help, Jo survives. The Doctor learns that the Marshal and his chief scientist Jaeger plan to terraform Solos, to make the planet habitable for humans, but not for indigenous life. The Marshal betrays Varan by killing his son. In response, Stubbs and Cotton, the Marshal's most senior officers, secretly ally with the Doctor. The now-fugitive Varan takes the Doctor hostage, fleeing to Solos' caverns, but the Doctor convinces him into a truce. There, they encounter many mutants, but fend them off. The Doctor reunites with Ky and Jo, and gives the pod to Ky. It opens to reveal ancient etched tablets that Ky cannot decipher. Frustrated at the lack of help, Varan stubbornly flees from the group. The Marshal later knowingly fumigates the caves with the Doctor, Jo, Ky, Stubbs, and Cotton still inside, but an outcast human scientist, Sondergaard, a Solonian anthropology expert, saves the group. He also explains his attempt to report the Marshal to Earth Control, but it was intercepted, so Sondergaard fled and hid in fear for his life. The Doctor and Sondergaard interpret the tablets as a lengthy Solonian calendar, and while investigating the caves, also find a mysterious crystal. From the calendar and crystal, the Doctor deduces the Mutant phase is a natural part of the Solonian life-cycle, triggered by Solos' transition into summer, but the Marshal's experiments triggered the mutations too soon.

To look into the strange events, the Earth government has dispatched an Investigator. Despite partly mutating, Varan attacks Skybase with his warriors, with Jo, Ky, Stubbs and Cotton as hostages. It fails, and a hull breach from the fight blows Varan out into space, nearly taking everyone else. The Marshal later sentences summary execution on the remaining four, but are saved by Jaeger's timely revelation of the terraform attempt failing and instead poisoning Solos' environment. Later, the four attempt to escape, while warning the Investigator's shuttle, but Stubbs is killed. The Doctor returns to Skybase – without Sondergaard, who was weakened from breathing the sun-exposed portions of Solos' atmosphere. To force the Doctor to rapidly decontaminate the planet with Skybase's technology before the Investigator's arrival, the Marshal imprisons Jo and the rest in a soon-to-be-radioactive thaesium refuelling bay. The inquiry is held, but the Marshal gives more lies, supported by the Doctor under duress. Luckily, the prisoners escape their fate and arrive to help the Investigator see the truth of the situation. Sondergaard recovers, discovers the mutants aren't animalistic, and also reaches Skybase to offer testimony. Unfortunately, a Mutant follows him and accidentally scares the Investigator enough to reinstate the Marshal's command and recommendation to eradicate the creatures.

Escaping from the guards, the Doctor quickly studies the crystal in the Skybase laboratory, confirming that it focuses and converts thaesium radiation from the deposits deep in the caves, beneficially accelerating the mutation process. The Marshal, now unbalanced from thoughts of ruling grandeur, forces Sondergaard (to whom the Doctor secretly gives the crystal), Jo, Cotton, and Ky back into the refuelling bay. There, Sondergaard gives a severely weakened Ky the crystal, who then absorbs all of the thaesium fuel and rapidly mutates, emerging as a radiant angel-like super-being and saving the prisoners. Meanwhile, the Marshal holds the Investigator's entourage hostage to be the first forced citizens of New Earth (on Solos), and orders the terraforming completed, but the Doctor covertly sabotages the terraformer's circuits, which overloads when Jaeger tries to operate it, killing him. Furious at his lost chance of domination, The Marshal takes aim at the Doctor, but Ky arrives and dispenses justice, vapourising the Marshal. Sondergaard and Cotton elect to stay to help see the other Solonians through their mutations, while Jo and the Doctor slip away, their mission from the Time Lords complete.

== Production ==
Exteriors shots on the planet Solos were filmed on location at Bluewater, Kent

Working titles for this story included Independence and The Emergents. Writers Bob Baker and Dave Martin, as well as producer Barry Letts, intended for The Mutants to have an anti-racist message. The basis of the story came from Letts, who had submitted the idea for Season 4 but it was rejected by script editor Gerry Davis for the 1966 story "The Mutant". Martin was highly concerned about the apartheid system in South Africa, which was reflected in the script. The story of The Mutants was intended to be a metaphor for South Africa with the Earth Empire standing for the white supremacist government of South Africa and the Solonians for the black population of South Africa. Martin had become fascinated with South Africa after an incident where his neighbor in Bristol had told him that he was moving to South Africa "to be a kind of master" over non-white people, leading him to learn about the apartheid system, which led him to become active in the anti-apartheid movement.

The way that Solos descends into chaos on the verge of independence was inspired by the bloody riots that erupted during the partition of India in 1947 as the British colony of India was divided into the new nations of Pakistan and India. Over a million people killed during the partition of India with the violence being especially vicious in the Punjab. The script editor, Terrance Dicks, had long wanted to do a story that would be an analogy for the end of the British empire, and worked extensively on the script by Martin and Baker in late 1971. Dicks was opposed to the anti-imperialist views of Martin and Baker as he recalled: "They [Baker and Martin] wanted to do something on the evils of Empire, which I didn't necessarily agree with because I was rather pro-British Empire. My view was and I suppose still is to a some extent is that it would had been a lot better if it was still there, you know. If you have a look at Africa or Asia or the rest of the world if the Brits were still in charge, it would all be running smoothly." Dicks softened the anti-imperialist theme of the original script. but Martin and Baker were able to hold onto to their primary message. The Doctor's remarks about a "crumbled" empire which can not longer afford the costs of the imperial project are about the Earth Empire in the 30th century, but could have just as easily have been about the British empire in the early 1970s. Initially, the term used for the mutants of Solos was to be "munt" (an abbreviation for "mutant native"), which was a real derogatory term used by South African whites to describe South African blacks. The term was changed to "mutt" in the final script because "munt" sounds similar to "cunt".

The bombastic crazed militarist, the Marshal, was based upon Benito Mussolini. That the Marshal is opposed to Solos being granted independence as he wishes to displace the native population of Solos in order to make way for colonists from Earth was a reference to Rhodesia. The Marshal is so determined to hang onto Solos as a colony that he assassinates the Administrator sent out from Earth to grant independence to Solos. In 1965, Ian Smith, the prime minister of the self-governing British colony of Southern Rhodesia (modern Zimbabwe) whose franchise was restricted to white settlers illegally declared unilateral independence rather than accept British plans to grant Southern Rhodesia independence on the basis of majority rule. The way the Marshal tries to keep the imperial project going in defiance of his own empire's wish to give up Solos in order to colonise it with millions of settlers from Earth was based on Rhodesia. The British critics Maura Grady and Celcia Hemstrom note that both the Administrator and the Marshal are caught up in imperial nostalgia as the Marshal wishes to turn Solos into a "new Earth" that will be colonised by settlers from Earth while the Administrator complains that Earth is now a toxic wasteland and the Earth Empire is economically "finished" owing to its ruined environment. The amoral German-accented scientist, Professor Jaeger, whose experiments are intended to exterminate the native population of Solos was based upon those German scientists who served the Nazi regime in devising ever more efficient methods of killing people. The more benevolent scientist, Professor Sondergaard, is dressed in a hippie style, which seems to reflect some approval of hippies by the writers. The way that the Earth in the story was portrayed in the 30th century as being so hopelessly polluted as to be toxic for human beings to live in was an environmentalist message about what the future of humanity would be if measures were not taken to save the environment in the 20th century.

The opening shot of the story features a bedraggled, hermit-like bearded figure (Sidney Johnson) shambling out of the mist towards the camera. Both fans and Jon Pertwee alike have compared the scene to the "It's" man at the start of most episodes of Monty Python's Flying Circus.

The mines of Solos were filmed on location at Chislehurst Caves near Bromley. They also filmed at Western Quarry which was the setting for the planet Solos, now the site of Bluewater Shopping Centre, and Stone House Farm Caves which was the entrance to Solos caves.

=== Cast notes ===
George Pravda (Jaeger) had previously played Denes in The Enemy of the World (1968) and would later play Castellan Spandrell in The Deadly Assassin (1976). Christopher Coll (Stubbs) had previously played Technician Phipps opposite Patrick Troughton in the 1969 serial The Seeds of Death. Geoffrey Palmer (the Administrator) had previously played Masters in Doctor Who and the Silurians (1970) and would later play Captain Hardaker in the 2007 Christmas special "Voyage of the Damned". Garrick Hagon (Ky) went on to play the character of Biggs Darklighter in Star Wars (1977) and would return to Doctor Who in 2012 to play Abrahams in A Town Called Mercy. John Hollis (Sondergaard) also took a Star Wars role as Lobot in The Empire Strikes Back (1980).

== Broadcast and reception ==
Episode	Title	Run time	Original release date	UK viewers (millions)	Archive
1	"Episode One"	24:25	8 April 1972	9.1	RSC converted (NTSC-to-PAL)
2	"Episode Two"	24:24	15 April 1972	7.8	RSC converted (NTSC-to-PAL)
3	"Episode Three"	24:32	22 April 1972	7.9	PAL 2" colour videotape
4	"Episode Four"	24:00	29 April 1972	7.5	PAL 2" colour videotape
5	"Episode Five"	24:37	6 May 1972	7.9	PAL 2" colour videotape
6	"Episode Six"	23:43	13 May 1972	6.5	PAL 2" colour videotape

In 2009, Patrick Mulkern of Radio Times stated that the serial was "peculiarly variable", with uneven performances and quality; he wrote that "the first episode is surprisingly leaden and unengaging, whereas episode four is one of the most stimulating and creatively innovative under Barry Letts' stewardship". He praised the design of the Mutants and some of the cliffhangers. DVD Talk's John Sinnott gave the story two and a half out of five stars, calling it "terribly average" but "a solid adventure ... worth watching". He was critical of the acting, especially Rick James, and felt that overall it was too long and "a bit convoluted". IGN reviewer Arnold T. Blumburg gave the story a score of 7 out of 10, writing that there was more to be appreciated as an adult to see "its role as a hard-edged indictment of the culture in which it was created". Ian Berriman of SFX gave The Mutants three out of five stars, noting its ambition to tackle social issues but concluded that the execution was "bungled".

The British critics Maura Grady and Cecilia Hemstrom praised The Mutants was one of the stronger anti-imperialist stories in Dr. Who. Grady and Hemstrom noted in the story the environment of the Earth in the 30th century has been ruined by centuries of pollution, turning the entire Earth into a monstrous toxic wasteland, which has led to humans colonising other planets to replace the ruined Earth with no thought for any of the natives of those planets. Grady and Hemstrom further noted that the colonists from Earth have not only set about ruining the environment of Solos in the same manner that they ruined the Earth, but also destroyed the culture of the Solonians to such an extent that the Solonians can no longer read their ancient hieroglyphs. Cut off from their culture and history, the Solonians are thus are unaware of their 500-year life cycle. Neither the Solonians nor the humans can understand that the mass mutations are merely part of the natural 500-year life cycle of the Solonians, and the humans react to a development that they do not understand by embarking on a genocide of the Solonians. Grady and Hemstron concluded that it not been for the colonialism the Solonians would have completed their life cycle without incident and that: "The episode is a fair warning that, no matter how well intended, interference with indigenous cultures can have dangerous and far-reaching consequences".

== Commercial releases ==
=== In print ===
Doctor Who and the Mutants
- Author: Terrance Dicks
- Cover artist: Jeff Cummins
- Series: Doctor Who book: Target novelisations
- Release number: 44
- Publisher: Target Books
- Publication date: 29 September 1977
- ISBN: 0-426-11690-9

A novelisation of this serial, written by Terrance Dicks, was published by Target Books in September 1977.

=== Home media ===
This story was released on VHS in February 2003 and was the penultimate Jon Pertwee story to be released in this format. The story was released on DVD on 31 January 2011.

In March 2023, the story was released again in an upgraded format for Blu-ray, being included with the four other stories from Season 9 in the Doctor Who - The Collection Box Set.

The music from this serial was released as part of Doctor Who: Devils' Planets – The Music of Tristram Cary in 2003.

== Books and articles ==
- Grady, Maura; Hemstrom, Celica (2013). "Nostalgia for Empire, 1963-1974". In Gillian I. Leitch (ed.). Doctor Who in Time and Space Essays on Themes, Characters, History and Fandom, 1963-2012. Jefferson: McFarland, Incorporated, Publishers. pp. 125–142. ISBN 9781476602240.
