= Tangier (1982 film) =

- Directed by: Michael E. Briant
- Starring: Ronny Cox; Billie Whitelaw; Glynis Barber
- Release date: 1982
- Countries: United States; Morocco
- Language: English

Tangier is a 1982 American-Moroccan thriller film directed by Michael E. Briant and starring Ronny Cox, Billie Whitelaw and Glynis Barber.

"Take the disappearance of a key British Intelligence Officer in Gibraltar, loaded with top secrets. Add a tough, down-on-his-luck ex-CIA agent with a murky past. Try a drop of blackmail. Garnish with two beautiful women. Sprinkle liberally with murder, treachery, and mayhem. Stir well till it all fizzes with danger and excitement that is Tangier. The result is a thriller that will grip you down to the last explosive moment. It's the thriller of the year. It's Tangier."

- from the cover of the Linked Ring VHS release 1982.

== Cast ==
- Ronny Cox as Bob Steele
- Billie Whitelaw as Louise
- Glynis Barber as Beth
- Ronald Lacey as Wedderburn
- Oscar Quitak as Velatti
- Jack Watson as Donovan
- Ronald Fraser as Jenkins
- Adel Frej as Ahmed
- Benjamin Feitelson as Fisher
- Peter Arne as Malen
- David Collings as Major Greville
- Connie Mason as Marsha
- Nicholson Donnelly as Major Crawley

== Production ==
Most of the outdoor scenes were filmed in both Morocco and Gibraltar.
