= Paul Bernard (director) =

British television director (1929–1997)

- Born: 20 June 1929; London, England
- Died: 25 September 1997 (aged 68); Twickenham, London, England

Paul Bernard (20 June 1929 – 25 September 1997) was an English television director and production designer.

Bernard was born in London, England. As a designer he worked on series including The Avengers. His direction credits include Coronation Street, The Tomorrow People, Z-Cars, four episodes of Virgin of the Secret Service (1968) (for which he also worked as a supervising producer with Robert D. Cardona), and the Doctor Who stories Day of the Daleks (1972), The Time Monster (1972) and Frontier in Space (1973).
