= The Sea Devils =

062 – The Sea Devils
- Doctor Who serial

Cast
- Doctor: Jon Pertwee – Third Doctor
- Companion: Katy Manning – Jo Grant
- Others: Roger Delgado – The Master; Clive Morton – Trenchard; Declan Mulholland – Clark; Hugh Futcher – Hickman; Brian Justice – Wilson; Terry Walsh – Barclay; Stanley McGeagh – Drew; Royston Tickner – Robbins; Neil Seiler – Radio Operator; Martin Boddey – Walker; Edwin Richfield – Captain Hart; June Murphy – 3rd Officer Jane Blythe; Norman Atkyns – Rear Admiral; Donald Sumpter – Commander Ridgeway; David Griffin – Lt. Commander Mitchell; Brian Vaughan – Lt. Commander Watts; Christopher Wray – Ldg. Seaman Lovell; Alec Wallis – Ldg. Telegraphist Bowman; Eric Mason – C.P.O. Smedley; John Caesar – C.P.O. Myers; Colin Bell – C.P.O. Summers; Rex Rowland – A/B Girton; Peter Forbes-Robertson – Chief Sea Devil; Pat Gorman – Sea Devil

Production
- Directed by: Michael E. Briant
- Written by: Malcolm Hulke
- Script editor: Terrance Dicks
- Produced by: Barry Letts
- Executive producer: None
- Music by: Malcolm Clarke
- Production code: LLL
- Series: Season 9
- Running time: 6 episodes, 25 minutes each
- First broadcast: 26 February 1972
- Last broadcast: 1 April 1972

Chronology
← Preceded by The Curse of Peladon	Followed by → The Mutants

The Sea Devils is the third serial of the ninth season of the long-running British science fiction television series Doctor Who, which was first broadcast in six weekly parts on BBC1 from 26 February to 1 April 1972. It was written by Malcolm Hulke and directed by Michael E. Briant. The serial is notable as the first appearance of the Sea Devils and features extensive location filming in cooperation with the Royal Navy, as well as an experimental electronic score by Malcolm Clarke.

The serial is set in various locations in and beneath the English Channel. In the serial, the alien time traveller the Master (Roger Delgado) makes contact with the Sea Devils, a bipedal marine race that ruled the Earth before humanity, and plots to use them to reconquer the Earth from humanity.

== Plot ==
The Third Doctor and Jo visit the Master, imprisoned on a small island in the English Channel. Despite his claim to have reformed, he refuses to reveal the location of his TARDIS. As they depart, the Doctor hears of ships mysteriously disappearing. Curious, he investigates a sea fortress, where he and Jo are attacked by a sea-adapted bipedal reptile, called a Sea Devil by one witness. They escape to a nearby naval base.

The Doctor discovers that the Master, with the misguided aid of his ostensible jailor Colonel Trenchard, is stealing electrical equipment from a naval research establishment on the island to build a machine that will control the so-called Sea Devils, intending to use them as an army through which to conquer the world. He summons them and they begin to emerge from the sea. A battle for the prison ensues during which Trenchard is killed. The Doctor and Jo once again flee to the naval base where the commanding officer, Captain Hart, tells them a submarine has disappeared. Whilst the crew prepare for battle, the Doctor is seized by the sea creatures.

The Doctor offers to broker peaceful negotiations between the sea-creatures and the humans, recalling how he failed in his earlier attempt with the Silurians, to whom the Sea Devils appear to be related. Matters are left unresolved in the wake of an attack by depth charges ordered by Robert Walker, a politician who has arrived to take control of the situation and intent on repeating UNIT's actions against the Silurians, namely blowing them up, but this time with a nuclear weapon. The attack is opposed by Jo, but does provide the Doctor with cover as he flees to the naval base, where he persuades Walker to allow him another, final attempt at negotiation. In the meantime the Sea Devils capture the naval base, a move instigated by the Master. As part of his plan, he now forces the Doctor to help build a machine to revive dormant Sea Devils around the world. With the device activated, the Sea Devils plan to imprison both the Doctor and Master with their usefulness ended. However, the Doctor has sabotaged the machine to react negatively against the Devils. He escapes with the Master using equipment from the captured submarine.

The sabotaged machine destroys the Sea Devil base before a military attack can begin. The Master evades capture by faking a heart attack and then hijacking a rescue hovercraft.

=== Outside references ===
Whilst imprisoned, the Master watches an episode of the children's television show Clangers. He jokingly suggests the knitted puppets are real extraterrestrials and shows incredulity at Trenchard, who takes his deadpan comment seriously and patiently explains it’s a show "for children".

== Production ==
Working titles for this story included The Sea Silurians. Because of the story's location filming requirements it was allocated the second slot in the production run for Doctor Who's ninth season so as to allow filming in October. However, to alternate the stories between those set on Earth and those set on other worlds it was transmitted third in the season. This was the first time stories were produced out of transmission order. The serial was mainly filmed around Portsmouth, HM Naval Base Portsmouth, No Man's Land Fort, the Isle of Wight and HMS Reclaim.

The earlier Doctor Who and the Silurians had resulted in many letters from scientists and geologists who argued that it was impossible for a reptilian lifeform to have existed in the Silurian period. In this story the Doctor admits that the name "Silurian" is inaccurate and states they should more properly be called "Eocenes".

The Royal Navy waived royalty fees on the use of stock footage and clips showing ships in action, happy with on-screen credits and the positive publicity generated by the show. Many sailors volunteered to help with the filming, so that most of the extras during the sequence at the naval base were actual service personnel, except in some of the stunts. In the first episode, the script called for Jo Grant and the Doctor to climb up a ladder to get into a sea fortress. The ladder proved too slippery for Katy Manning, so stuntman Stuart Fell did the shot dressed as Grant.

A model of a submarine was created by purchasing a Woolworths submarine model kit and then altering the propeller. By chance, the alterations to the model strongly resembled an actual prototype submarine being developed by the Ministry of Defence. After footage of the model was broadcast as part of the story, director Michael Briant received a visit from two Naval Intelligence officials, who were concerned about where the visual effects team got the plans for the model.

When the wiping of episodes ceased in 1978, it was discovered that the first three episodes had only survived as black and white telerecordings made for overseas sales. In the early 1980s NTSC transfers of all six episodes were returned from broadcasters in Canada. These were converted back to the original PAL format.

=== Music ===
The BBC Radiophonic Workshop's Malcolm Clarke composed the incidental music for the story. It was his first contribution to the series and was notably more experimental than the series' usual scores by freelance composer Dudley Simpson. Clarke's score was entirely electronic, created on the Radiophonic Workshop's EMS Synthi 100 synthesizer. His score for the serial has been described as "startling in its range of obtrusive electronic timbres and relative melodic paucity", "mixed music and sound effects" and "presented uncomfortable sounds to a substantial early evening audience on Saturdays in a way not duplicated in Britain before or since". The music was presented as a suite on the 1983 LP Doctor Who: The Music, and was released in full on the 2000 compilation album Doctor Who at the BBC Radiophonic Workshop Volume 2: New Beginnings 1970–1980. Parts of the incidental music, as well as a line of dialogue, were sampled by Orbital on their track Doctor Look Out.

== Broadcast and reception ==
Episode	Title	Run time	Original release date	UK viewers (millions)	Archive
1	"Episode One"	24:40	26 February 1972	6.4	RSC converted (NTSC-to-PAL)
2	"Episode Two"	24:30	4 March 1972	9.7	RSC converted (NTSC-to-PAL)
3	"Episode Three"	24:05	11 March 1972	8.3	RSC converted (NTSC-to-PAL)
4	"Episode Four"	24:21	18 March 1972	7.8	PAL 2" colour videotape
5	"Episode Five"	24:53	25 March 1972	8.3	PAL 2" colour videotape
6	"Episode Six"	25:24	1 April 1972	8.5	PAL 2" colour videotape

The story was edited and condensed into a single omnibus episode, broadcast on BBC1 at 3:05 pm on 27 December 1972, reaching 8.7 million viewers. An unscheduled repeat of the omnibus was shown again on 27 May 1974, with a rating of 4.6 million viewers; this was because a strike had prevented live coverage of Bank Holiday sport. A full repeat of all six episodes was shown on BBC2 from 6 March to 10 April 1992, 20 years after the original broadcast, with ratings of 3.12, 3.55, 2.96, 3.37, 3.10 & 3.04 million viewers, respectively. As referenced on the DVD release on screen notes, episode 1 was originally transmitted at the end of the 1972 UK miners' strike which had caused national power blackouts, possibly accounting for the sharp increase in viewers from episode 2. Due to the national power cuts that impacted the broadcast of episode 1, an extensive recap was shown prior to the commencement of the broadcast of episode 2.

Paul Cornell, Martin Day and Keith Topping gave the serial a favourable review in The Discontinuity Guide (1995), calling it "a good Malcolm Hulke script", with a "pedestrian" pace that still allowed for some suspense. They believed the music "veers between being eerily experimental and tunelessly intrusive". In The Television Companion (1998), David J. Howe and Stephen James Walker described the story as "a colourful adventure yarn" with quality direction and high production values. They praised the acting of both the main cast and the guests, finding Trenchard the most interesting. They noted that the incidental music had a mixed reception because of its radical departure, but it remained the most striking aspect of the story. In 2009, Patrick Mulkern of Radio Times wrote that The Sea Devils was the Third Doctor's era reaching an "apex in ambition and quality", praising the design of the Sea Devils and the supporting characters. DVD Talk's John Sinnott wrote that the story was "very good", although he felt it would have been better as a four- or five-parter. He also disliked the incidental music. Den of Geek regarded The Sea Devils as the best story on the Beneath the Surface DVD boxset (including Doctor Who and the Silurians and Warriors of the Deep), though it was also noted that the story would have worked better if it was shorter. The website included the serial on their list of "Top 10 Classic Doctor Who Scores".

== Commercial releases ==
=== In print ===
Doctor Who and the Sea-Devils
- Author: Malcolm Hulke
- Cover artist: Chris Achilleos
- Series: Doctor Who book: Target novelisations
- Release number: 54
- Publisher: Target Books
- Publication date: 17 October 1974
- ISBN: 0-426-11308-X

A novelisation of this serial, written by Malcolm Hulke, was published by Target Books in October 1974 and was originally to be titled The Sea Monsters. There are, as usual with Hulke, many added sections—including an ironic death for Trenchard as he makes a last stand against the Sea Devils and forgets to take the safety catch off his pistol. Also, the Master makes reference to his alliance with the Ogrons in the later serial Frontier in Space (also written by Hulke). A Portuguese translation was published in 1983.

In June 2012, an audiobook of the novelisation was released, read by Geoffrey Beevers.

=== Home media ===
The story was released on VHS in September 1995. The copy of Episode Five used was the NTSC version, despite the fact work had been done a year or so previously to remove the scratch from the PAL version. The story's original soundtrack was released on CD as part of the 'Monsters on Earth' tin set along with Doctor Who and the Silurians and Warriors of the Deep in October 2006 and linking narration was provided by Katy Manning. The CD was re-issued individually in January 2008. The Sea Devils was released on DVD as part of a boxed set called Beneath the Surface with Doctor Who and the Silurians and Warriors of the Deep on 14 January 2008. In March 2023, the story was released again in an upgraded format for Blu-ray, being included with the four other stories from Season 9 in the Doctor Who - The Collection Box Set.

The complete music score for this serial was released on Doctor Who at the BBC Radiophonic Workshop Volume 2: New Beginnings 1970–1980.

=== Re-edit ===
A re-edited version of the series condensing the six 25-minute episodes into a single 90-minute film was made by the BBC and shown on BBC4 to coincide with the premiere of the spin-off series The War Between the Land and the Sea on 7 December 2025.
