= The Curse of Peladon =

061 – The Curse of Peladon
- Doctor Who serial

Cast
- Doctor: Jon Pertwee – Third Doctor
- Companion: Katy Manning – Jo Grant
- Others: David Troughton – King Peladon; Henry Gilbert – Chancellor Torbis; Geoffrey Toone – Hepesh; Gordon St. Clair – Grun; George Giles – Guard Captain; Nick Hobbs – Aggedor; Stuart Fell – Body of Alpha Centauri; Ysanne Churchman – Voice of Alpha Centauri; Alan Bennion – Izlyr; Sonny Caldinez – Ssorg; Murphy Grumbar – Arcturus; Terry Bale – Voice of Arcturus; Wendy Danvers – Amazonia

Production
- Directed by: Lennie Mayne
- Written by: Brian Hayles
- Script editor: Terrance Dicks
- Produced by: Barry Letts
- Executive producer: None
- Music by: Dudley Simpson
- Production code: MMM
- Series: Season 9
- Running time: 4 episodes, 25 minutes each
- First broadcast: 29 January 1972
- Last broadcast: 19 February 1972

Chronology
← Preceded by Day of the Daleks	Followed by → The Sea Devils

The Curse of Peladon is the second serial of the ninth season of the British science fiction television series Doctor Who, which was first broadcast in four weekly parts on BBC1 from 29 January to 19 February 1972.

The serial is set on the superstitious and mineral-rich planet Peladon. In the serial, the alien time traveller the Third Doctor (Jon Pertwee) and his travelling companion Jo Grant (Katy Manning) discover the High Priest Hepesh (Geoffrey Toone) conspiring to stop Peladon from joining the Galactic Federation, so that the old ways on the planet are preserved.

== Plot ==
The planet Peladon, led by its young king Peladon, is on the verge of joining the Galactic Federation, their delegates ready to deliberate and take a final vote. High Priest Hepesh is opposed, warning that the curse of Aggedor the Royal Beast of Peladon will visit doom upon them.

The TARDIS materialises on the edge of a cliff below the castle. The Third Doctor and Jo barely leave the ship before it tumbles over the edge of the cliff; they climb to the castle to get help.

Peladon asks for Hepesh's support to join the Federation, but Hepesh does not trust the aliens. The Doctor and Jo are discovered by palace guards, who take them to the throne room where the delegates are gathered: Alpha Centauri, Arcturus, and Lord Izlyr and Ssorg of the Ice Warriors. The Doctor is mistaken for the delegate from Earth. He introduces Jo as "Princess Josephine of TARDIS", a neutral royal observer from Earth. Several unusual accidents affecting the delegates lead The Doctor to suspect the Ice Warriors.

Exploring the tunnels under the palace, the Doctor runs into, and flees from, the creature known as Aggedor. Entering the beast's shrine room, he is discovered by Hepesh. Hepesh accuses the Doctor of sacrilege, who must endure trial by combat, a duel to the death with the royal champion. Later, in the Doctor's cell, Hepesh helps him escape, only to encounter Aggedor again, only this time he calms the beast with a hypnotic device.

The Doctor tries to tell Peladon about the beast, but Hepesh again orders that he be taken away to face the royal champion, who is defeated, the Doctor also sparing his life. Arcturus tries to kill the Doctor but is shot by Ssorg. It is revealed that Hepesh, his accomplice, tried to frame the Ice Warriors, and trained Aggedor to maintain superstition, having made an agreement with Arcturus over Peladon's mineral deposits. The vote for intervention carries unanimously, but the delegates cannot communicate with their ships. Hepesh's forces take the throne room and hold Peladon hostage. Hepesh orders him to go back to the old ways or die. The Doctor arrives with Aggedor, who kills Hepesh.

On their way to attend Peladon's coronation, the Doctor and Jo see the real delegate from Earth, who has just arrived. They rush back to the TARDIS to avoid explaining themselves.

== Production ==
The story was broadcast during the 1972 United Kingdom miners' strike, which led to many parts of the UK undergoing scheduled power cuts. This may account for the drop in viewers for the last two episodes. According to the DVD notes for The Peladon Tales, this industrial action partly inspired the sequel The Monster of Peladon.

During production it was noted that Alpha Centauri had a somewhat phallic appearance. So director Lennie Mayne insisted on the addition of a yellow cape to the costume in an attempt to rectify this.

According to the extensive production paperwork published as part of the 2023 re-release of the story as part of Doctor Who - The Collection Box Set, Hayles' first two commissions were rejected by the production team. The first was titled The Shape of Terror and did not feature the Ice Warriors. When this was rejected, Hayles was asked to incorporate the Ice Warriors into his next treatment, Doctor Who and the Brain Dead, which was also rejected. The delays in commissioning the story meant that production of the next adventure, The Sea Devils was brought forward while Hayles developed the accepted storyline. Working titles for this story included The Curse and Curse of the Peladons. The original 625-line master videotapes of the serial were wiped around 1975. In the late 1970s, 525-line NTSC copies were returned to the BBC from Canada. The tape of Episode Three was in a very poor condition and a salvage transfer to 625-line was made in 1982 for a repeat of the story; the NTSC tape was then reported to be junked. As a result, it was feared that it might not have been possible to make a new Reverse Standards Conversion (RSC) of the episode. However, the NTSC tape of Episode Three had not been lost but had instead been given to Ian Levine; Levine then lent the tape to the restoration team. After heat treatment, the restored NTSC tape was then used to create a new RSC 625-line videotape digital copy.

The "Venusian lullaby" sung to Aggedor is to the tune of the Christmas carol, "God Rest Ye Merry, Gentlemen".

=== Cast notes ===
David Troughton is the son of Second Doctor actor Patrick Troughton. He had previously appeared in Doctor Who as Moor in The War Games (1969), and he would appear in the revived series episode entitled "Midnight" (2008). Geoffrey Toone previously appeared as Temmosus in the film Dr. Who and the Daleks (1965).

== Themes and analysis ==
The story can be seen as a political allegory about the real-world issue of whether Britain should join the European Economic Community, with the alien delegates representing Europeans, King Peladon representing a younger generation of hope in agreement with joining the Federation, and Hepesh, who wants to preserve the status quo, representing the decision not to join. An allegory can also be drawn to the conflict of religion and science.

== Broadcast and reception ==
Episode	Title	Run time	Original release date	UK viewers (millions)	Archive
1	"Episode One"	24:32	29 January 1972	10.3	RSC converted (NTSC-to-PAL)
2	"Episode Two"	24:33	5 February 1972	11.0	RSC converted (NTSC-to-PAL)
3	"Episode Three"	24:21	12 February 1972	7.8	RSC converted (NTSC-to-PAL)
4	"Episode Four"	24:16	19 February 1972	8.4	RSC converted (NTSC-to-PAL)

Paul Cornell, Martin Day, and Keith Topping, in The Discontinuity Guide (1995), described The Curse of Peladon as "dull, but worthy". In The Television Companion (1998), David J. Howe and Stephen James Walker praised the inventiveness and individuality of the aliens, as well as the change of the Ice Warriors from evil to good. They concluded that it was "a hugely enjoyable story, and one of the real gems of the third Doctor's era". In 2009, Mark Braxton of Radio Times called the story an "exciting, elegant four-parter". He praised Jo and the various aliens, though he felt Aggedor was less successful and would have been better if he was bigger. DVD Talk's John Sinnott gave the serial four and a half out of five stars, writing that it "has everything that a fan could want: some interesting aliens, old adversaries, a solid mystery, a good amount of action, and a healthy dollop of humor". He praised the character of Hepesh and effort gone into making the aliens unique, but felt that the King was the weakest aspect as he was not a good leader, which made the romance with Jo not as believable. The A.V. Club reviewer Christopher Bahn stated that the serial was a success in returning to an "old-fashioned" format, but the murder-mystery genre was not fully realised, with the Doctor not figuring it out and Hepesh taking up most of the fourth episode.

This story was repeated on BBC One (excluding BBC Wales) as two 50min compilation episodes on 12 and 19 July 1982 as part of "Doctor Who and the Monsters", achieving viewing figures of 5.2 and 4.2 million respectively.

== Commercial releases ==
=== In print ===
Doctor Who and the Curse of Peladon
- Author: Brian Hayles
- Cover artist: Chris Achilleos
- Series: Doctor Who book: Target novelisations
- Release number: 13
- Publisher: Target Books
- Publication date: January 1975
- ISBN: 0-426-10452-8

A novelisation of this serial, written by Brian Hayles, was published by Target Books in January 1975. In 1995 the abridged novel was released by BBC Audio as an audio book, read by Jon Pertwee. An unabridged reading of the novel was released in 2013 on CD by AudioGo, this time read by David Troughton, who had played King Peladon in the TV serial.

=== Home media ===
The Curse of Peladon was released on VHS in August 1993 for the series' 30th anniversary. The story's original soundtrack was released in the UK in November 2007 and linking narration was provided by Katy Manning. The CD also featured a bonus interview with the actress. The serial was released on DVD on 18 January 2010 in a boxset entitled "Peladon Tales", along with The Monster of Peladon. In March 2023, the story was released again in an upgraded format for Blu-ray, being included with the four other stories from Season 9 in the Doctor Who - The Collection Box Set.
