= Day of the Daleks =

060 – Day of the Daleks
- Doctor Who serial

Cast
- Doctor: Jon Pertwee – Third Doctor
- Companion: Katy Manning – Jo Grant
- Others: Nicholas Courtney – Brigadier Lethbridge-Stewart; Richard Franklin – Captain Mike Yates; John Levene – Sergeant Benton; Wilfred Carter – Sir Reginald Styles; Jean McFarlane – Miss Paget; Anna Barry – Anat; Scott Fredericks – Boaz; Jimmy Winston – Shura; Tim Condren – Guerilla; Aubrey Woods – Controller; Valentine Palmer – Monia; Peter Hill – Manager; Andrew Carr – Senior Guard; George Raistrick – Guard; Alex MacIntosh – Television Reporter; Gypsie Kemp – UNIT Radio Operator; Deborah Brayshaw – Technician; Rick Lester, Maurice Bush, David Joyce, Frank Menzies, Bruce Wells, Geoffrey Todd – Ogrons; Oliver Gilbert, Peter Messaline – Dalek Voices (Note: Also provided telephone and radio voices, uncredited.); John Scott Martin, Murphy Grumbar, Ricky Newby – Daleks

Production
- Directed by: Paul Bernard
- Written by: Louis Marks
- Script editor: Terrance Dicks
- Produced by: Barry Letts
- Executive producer: None
- Music by: Dudley Simpson
- Production code: KKK
- Series: Season 9
- Running time: 4 episodes, 25 minutes each
- First broadcast: 1 January 1972
- Last broadcast: 22 January 1972

Chronology
← Preceded by The Dæmons	Followed by → The Curse of Peladon

Day of the Daleks is the first serial of the ninth season of the British science fiction television series Doctor Who, which was first broadcast in four weekly parts from 1 to 22 January 1972. It was the first of four Third Doctor serials to feature the Daleks, which returned to the series for the first time since The Evil of the Daleks (1967).

In the serial, the Doctor and UNIT investigate the attempted assassination of British diplomat Sir Reginald Styles, whose attacker apparently disappeared into thin air.

== Plot ==
A British diplomat, Sir Reginald Styles, is organising a peace conference to avert World War III. In his study at Auderly House he is held at gunpoint by a soldier wielding a futuristic-looking pistol, who then mysteriously vanishes. The shaken Styles believes that he has been visited by a ghost. The Third Doctor, Jo and the Brigadier go to Auderly House to investigate the mystery. The Doctor discovers a crude time machine and an ultrasonic disintegrator gun. He and Jo spend the night at Auderly House to monitor any activity.

The machine turns out to be from the 22nd Century. As the Doctor tries to reactivate the time machine, three rebel fighters – Anat, Boaz, and Shura – appear from the time vortex on a mission to assassinate Styles. It transpires that the rebels come from an alternate future in which a war-ravaged Earth has been enslaved by the Daleks. The outbreak of world war has been attributed to an explosion at the 20th-century peace conference, and the rebels believe that by assassinating Styles, they can alter future events and prevent the Dalek invasion from ever taking place. The Doctor surmises that the rebel attack itself will be the cause of the explosion, and that the rebels are caught up in a time paradox.

The time machine contains a homing device which alerts the Daleks to the Doctor's location. They launch an attack, and the ensuing battle shifts back and forth between the 20th and 22nd Centuries. The Doctor and Jo discover a future world of an enslaved society, overseen by a military force of primitive humanoid Ogrons, supervised by a powerful Controller, all under the command of Daleks. After escaping capture, they return to the 20th century, where the Doctor orders UNIT troops to evacuate the peace conference and lure the Daleks into Auderly House. Shura detonates a dalekanium bomb, destroying the house and the invading Daleks, and correcting the course of the future.

The Doctor tells Styles that he must make the conference a success, because they know what will happen in the future if they fail.

== Production ==
Working titles for this story included The Ghost Hunters and Years of Doom. As originally written, the serial revolved around the Ogrons instead of the Daleks. It was planned to bring the Daleks back at the end of the season, in a serial called The Daleks in London by Robert Sloman. This plan was dropped when the production staff realised that the show would not have a hook to entice viewers (after the Third Doctor's introduction in Season 7 and that of the Master in Season 8), and Sloman's serial was allegedly shaping up to be too similar to The Dalek Invasion of Earth. Instead, writer Louis Marks was asked to alter his serial to include the Daleks. Osterley Park was originally proposed as the setting and location for Day of the Daleks. The name was changed to Auderly House in the finished programme and renamed Austerly House in the novelisation.

Jon Pertwee, who would later say, "I have never liked the Daleks", felt that the monsters were very limited and could not understand their popularity. However, he would concede that the publicity which followed the announcement of their return to the series by Barry Letts "was perhaps worth my biting my lip". On the other hand, he enjoyed working with the story's guest cast. He also liked the Ogrons, as unlike the Daleks, their design allowed the actors' mouths and lips to be seen and thus he felt allowed the actors playing them to "come to grips" with their characters and "with an entire range of expressions available" make the viewers believe in their performance. Pertwee also recalled he persuaded Barry Letts to include the trikes seen in the story, reflecting his love of vehicles. However, he considered the chase sequence involving them to be "one of the more dangerous stunts that I had insisted on doing" during his time on the series.

Terry Nation, who penned the first Dalek story, The Daleks in 1963, was given an on-screen credit at the end of all four episodes of this story as having originated them. The production team only had three Dalek props available for use during the production of this serial, so only three Daleks appear on screen at any one time. One of the Daleks is painted gold, so only two regular casings are seen in shot. Film editing is used to attempt the illusion of more than three Daleks. The final battle at Auderly House was disliked by viewers, as it was quite obvious that only three Daleks were attacking. On the 2011 DVD release, CGI and newly shot footage was used to revamp the scene, making it appear that more Daleks were attacking the house.

Early in the first episode, there is a scene where the Doctor and Jo are working on the TARDIS console in the Doctor's lab. A mistake by the Doctor causes another Doctor and Jo to briefly appear at the entrance to the lab and then vanish. Originally the serial was to end with a scene where the Doctor and Jo went back to the lab, and saw their earlier selves working on the TARDIS console as before, after which they would vanish. However, director Paul Bernard refused to film it, saying, "Once it's over, it's over". Script editor Terrance Dicks would later restore the scene in his novelisation of the story. This story features the TARDIS console once more outside of the TARDIS itself, as in The Ambassadors of Death and Inferno.

This serial is unusual because episodes two and three begin with the cliffhanger music that ended the previous episode being played again.

=== Filming locations ===
Dropmore House was instead used as the location for the peace conference. Brentford Towers in Green Dragon Lane, Brentford was used to portray the Controller's futuristic base.

=== Cast notes ===
Scott Fredericks later played Max Stael in Image of the Fendahl (1977).

Jimmy Winston had previously been the keyboard player in the rock band Small Faces.

== Broadcast and reception ==
Episode	Title	Run time	Original release date	UK viewers (millions)	Archive
1	"Episode One"	23:36	1 January 1972	9.8	PAL 2" colour videotape
2	"Episode Two"	23:52	8 January 1972	10.4	PAL 2" colour videotape
3	"Episode Three"	24:18	15 January 1972	9.1	PAL 2" colour videotape
4	"Episode Four"	24:17	22 January 1972	9.1	PAL 2" colour videotape

The story was edited and condensed into a single omnibus edition for broadcast on BBC1 at 7 pm on 3 September 1973, with viewing figures of 7.4 million.

Paul Cornell, Martin Day, and Keith Topping wrote of the serial in The Discontinuity Guide (1995), "A clever (if unoriginal) idea which is spoiled by the pointless inclusion of the Daleks themselves. The series' first proper look at some of the complexities of time travel is handled well even if some of the international politics is moronic." In 2009, Patrick Mulkern of Radio Times awarded it four stars out of five. He noted that the Daleks were not at their best production-wise, but he praised the Ogrons, Pertwee, and the cliffhangers. While he acknowledged the production shortcomings of the final battle, he summed the story up as "pacey, thought-provoking entertainment [that] has stood the test of time better than some of its contemporaries". In Doctor Who: The Complete Guide, Mark Campbell awarded it nine out of ten, describing it as an "intelligently scripted Terminator prototype" with a "credible future world and an effective documentary-style approach to much of the present-day action." However, he believed that the downside was that "the Daleks seem oddly static".

DVD Talk's John Sinnott gave Day of the Daleks four out of five stars, writing that it "has everything" and that the time travel plot was refreshingly traditional science fiction. Ian Berriman of SFX also rated the serial four out of five stars, describing it as "a fascinating concept, played out as rollicking action-adventure". He wrote that its weaknesses were "mainly on a technical level", concerning the Daleks and the final battle. In 2018, The Daily Telegraph ranked Day of the Daleks at number 53 in "the 56 greatest stories and episodes", arguing that "the Daleks' apelike henchmen, the Ogrons, are well-designed and Jon Pertwee's Doctor runs the full gamut from one-man wine and cheese society to man of action, to stern authority in his scenes in the 22nd century".

== Commercial releases ==
=== In print ===
Doctor Who and the Day of the Daleks
- Author: Terrance Dicks
- Cover artist: Chris Achilleos
- Series: Doctor Who book: Target novelisations
- Release number: 18
- Publisher: Target Books
- Publication date: April 1974
- ISBN: 0-426-10380-7

The novelisation of this serial, by Dicks, was published by Target Books in April 1974. There have been Dutch, Turkish, Japanese, Polish and Portuguese language editions. A Brazilian edition, separate from the Portuguese version, was published with the title Doutor Who e a Mudança da História (Doctor Who and the Change in History).

=== Home media ===
This is the earliest story for which all the original PAL 2" videotapes exist. The story was first released on VHS and Betamax in an omnibus format in 1986 (with the story mistitled as The Day of the Daleks on the VHS box art) and re-released in episodic format in 1994. The previous VHS omnibus edition remained as the release for the United States and Canada. This story was released on LaserDisc twice, first in an omnibus format in the United States in 1992, and later in episodic format in the UK in 1996. A DVD was released on 12 September 2011. The 2-disc DVD contains both the original broadcast version and, on the second disc, a special edition version with new CGI effects, newly shot footage and new Dalek voices performed by Nicholas Briggs, who has provided the Dalek voices for the series since the 2005 relaunch. The DVD features included an audio commentary, on-screen text notes, a documentary "Blasting the Past" in which the cast and crew, as well as fans of the series who are now writers, looked back over the making of the serial. In March 2023, the story was released again in an upgraded format for Blu-ray, being included with the four other stories from Season 9 in the Doctor Who - The Collection Box Set.

== Legacy ==
John Byrne has stated that he unconsciously lifted the basic plot of "Days of Future Past" from Day of the Daleks.
