= Michael E. Briant =

British actor and director

- Born: Michael Edwin Briant; 14 February 1942 (age 84); Bournemouth, Hampshire, England
- Occupations: Television director, author

Michael Edwin Briant (born 14 February 1942) is a retired British television director and author, best known for his work as a director for BBC television drama in the 1970s and 1980s.

== Career ==
At the age of 21 Briant joined the BBC as an assistant floor manager in the drama department and a year later became a production assistant. In 1966, he took a Directors Course. Sometimes credited as just Michael Briant, he subsequently directed series such as Z-Cars and Doctor Who directing Jon Pertwee and Tom Baker in a total of six serials: Colony in Space (1971), The Sea Devils (1972), The Green Death (1973), Death to the Daleks (1974), Revenge of the Cybermen (1975) and The Robots of Death (1977). He went on to direct four episodes from the first season of Blake's 7 in 1978, and Secret Army between 1978 and 1979. He later directed four of the six episodes of its sequel, Kessler, and the thriller series Blood Money, in which he cast many of the actors from Secret Army.

Briant's other directing work included a BBC adaptation of Robert Louis Stevenson's Treasure Island, the Emmy-award-winning BBC adaptation of Charles Dickens's story A Tale of Two Cities, the feature film Tangiers, the series Hideaway, One By One and EastEnders. Briant was also responsible for developing Howards' Way, and directed several episodes during its first series. He also spent time directing television in the Netherlands.

Briant discusses his move from acting to directing and his time spent working on Treasure Island in the 2021 YouTube video Director - Michael E Briant

Briant has been involved with DVD releases of his Doctor Who episodes, appearing on various documentaries and commentary tracks. He has also become a successful author. His autobiography Who is Michael Briant? was published by Classic Press and his books French Canal Routes to the Mediterranean, The Gentle Sailing Route to the Mediterranean, Strait Sailing to Gibraltar and Living Aboard Around the World were published by EdwinEditions.

Following his circumnavigation in a Moody 36 sailing boat he has written a number of books about boating including French Canal Routes to the Mediterranean and The Atlantic Crossing Guide all of which are for sale as downloads from http://www.gentlesailing.com/. His YouTube channel which is also entirely about sailing and @SailingGently now has almost 19,000 subscribers and over a million views. Currently his boat 'Golden Haze' is in Martinique and is the base for his video films and books. He lives in northern France and southern Spain

In 2021 Michael Briant contributed to the documentary tribute Alfred Burke is Frank Marker.

== Selected filmography ==
Year	Title	Network	Notes
1969	The Newcomers	BBC	2 episodes
1970 – 1971	The Doctors	BBC	10 episodes
1970 – 1974	Z- Cars	BBC	5 episodes
1971 – 1977	Doctor Who	BBC	Colony in Space - 6 episodes; The Sea Devils - 6 episodes; The Green Death - 6 episodes; Death to the Daleks - 4 episodes; Revenge of the Cybermen - 4 episodes; The Robots of Death - 4 episodes
1975	Sutherland's Law	BBC	2 episodes
1975 – 1976	Angels	BBC	2 episodes
1975 – 1976	Dixon of Dock Green	BBC	4 episodes
1976 – 1977	Warship	BBC	5 episodes
1977	Treasure Island	BBC	4 episodes
1978	Blake's 7	BBC	5 episodes
1978	The Onedin Line	BBC	1 episode
1978	Within These Walls	LWT	1 episode
1978 – 1979	Secret Army	BBC	7 episodes
1979 – 1992	Emmerdale	Yorkshire Television	25 episodes
1980	A Tale of Two Cities	BBC	8 episodes
1980	Breakaway	BBC	6 episodes
1981	Blood Money	BBC	6 episodes
1981	Kessler	BBC	4 episodes
1982	Tangier		Film
1985	One By One	BBC	6 episodes
1986	Hideaway	BBC	6 episodes
1987	Howards' Way	BBC	6 episodes
1995	EastEnders	BBC	3 episodes
