= Third Doctor =

Fictional character from Doctor Who

The Doctor
The Third Doctor
- Doctor Who character
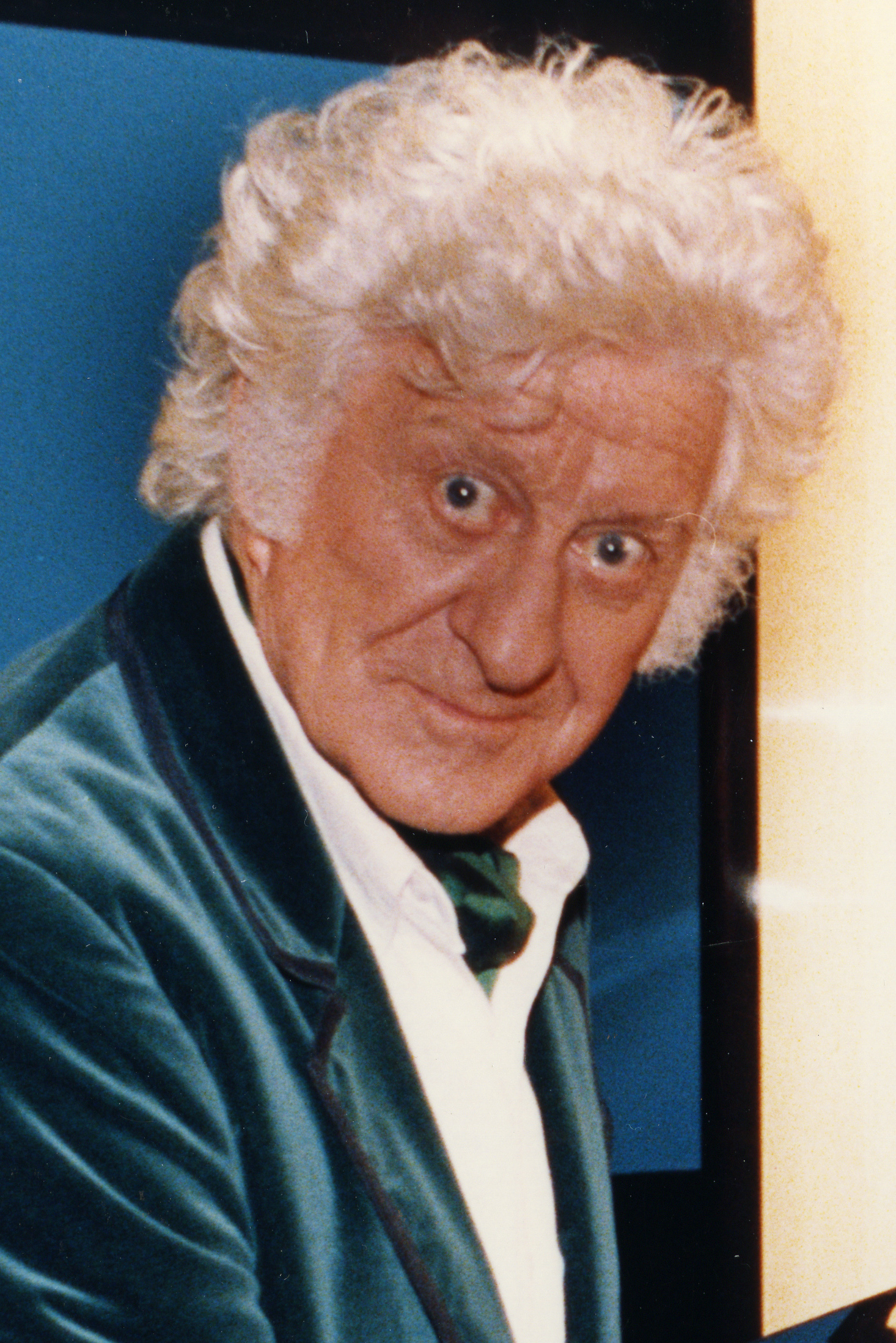
- Jon Pertwee as the Third Doctor in a promotional photo in 1985
- First regular appearance: Spearhead from Space (1970)
- Last regular appearance: Planet of the Spiders (1974)
- Introduced by: Derrick Sherwin
- Portrayed by: Jon Pertwee
- Preceded by: Patrick Troughton (Second Doctor)
- Succeeded by: Tom Baker (Fourth Doctor)

Information
- Tenure: 3 January 1970 – 8 June 1974
- No of series: 5
- Appearances: 24 stories (128 episodes)
- Companions: Brigadier Lethbridge-Stewart; Liz Shaw; Mike Yates; Jo Grant; Sergeant Benton; Sarah Jane Smith
- Chronology: Season 7 (1970); Season 8 (1971); Season 9 (1972); Season 10 (1972–1973); Season 11 (1973–1974); Season 20 (1983)

The Third Doctor is an incarnation of the Doctor, the protagonist of the British science fiction television series Doctor Who. He was portrayed by actor Jon Pertwee. Within the series' narrative, the Doctor is a centuries-old alien Time Lord from the planet Gallifrey who travels in time and space in the TARDIS, frequently with companions. At the end of life, the Doctor regenerates. Consequently, both the physical appearance and personality of the Doctor changes. Preceded in regeneration by the Second Doctor (Patrick Troughton), he is followed by the Fourth Doctor (Tom Baker).

Pertwee portrays the Third Doctor as a dapper man of action, in stark contrast to his wily but less action-oriented predecessors. While previous Doctors' stories had all involved time and space travel, for production reasons Pertwee's stories initially depicted the Doctor stranded on Earth in exile, where he worked as a scientific advisor to the international military group UNIT. Within the story, the Third Doctor came into existence as part of a punishment from his own race, the Time Lords, who forced him to regenerate and also disabled his TARDIS. Eventually, this restriction is lifted and the Third Doctor embarks on more traditional time travel and space exploration stories.

His initial companion is UNIT scientist Liz Shaw (Caroline John), who leaves the Doctor's company between episodes to be replaced by Jo Grant (Katy Manning), who then continues to accompany the Doctor after he regains use of his TARDIS. His final companion is journalist Sarah Jane Smith (Elisabeth Sladen).

== Biography ==
After the Doctor was found guilty of breaking the Time Lord laws of non-interference and forced to regenerate, he began his third incarnation in exile on 20th century Earth. The Third Doctor immediately formed a working relationship with the British contingent of UNIT, an international organisation tasked to investigate and defend the Earth against extraterrestrial threats.

It was a partnership initially born out of convenience — the Doctor required facilities to try to repair his TARDIS to break the exile, and UNIT needed his expertise to combat the threats they encountered. There is some disagreement about when the Third Doctor's UNIT stories were set, with some evidence that they were contemporary stories set at the same time they were broadcast (the early 70s), and some evidence that they were set in the near future. According to the production team, there was an intention to set the stories in the near future, but the writers did not always remember this and set the stories in the present.

The Doctor also developed a good working relationship with Brigadier Lethbridge-Stewart, whom he had first encountered, in his previous incarnation, as a Colonel in command of troops fighting Yeti and the Cybermen. As well as the Brigadier, he developed friendships with other regular UNIT colleagues including Sergeant Benton and Captain Mike Yates. When meteors were seen falling to Earth in Essex, the Doctor together with a UNIT scientist named Liz Shaw were to face the Autons for the first time. The Autons were to be one of the Doctor's recurring foes. At the conclusion of this adventure, the Doctor became UNIT's scientific advisor. After facing Silurians, the so-called Ambassadors of Death and the Inferno project, Liz was replaced as the Doctor's assistant by a feisty but slightly scatter-brained young woman named Jo Grant.

After meeting Jo, the Third Doctor encountered his greatest nemesis (next to the Daleks) — the Master. A renegade Time Lord, the Master plagued the Third Doctor with his diabolical schemes, including the summoning of an ancient Dæmon, and unleashing the terrifyingly powerful Kronos, a Chronovore. The Doctor's exile continued until it was lifted by the Time Lords after he helped save them from destruction at the hands of Omega. The Third Doctor, free to roam space and time again, soon ran into the Master and an even older enemy — the Daleks. Although the Master was a criminal genius, the Doctor was always able to outwit him in all his schemes. Whilst facing the ecological destruction wrought by Global Chemicals and the super computer BOSS, Jo met and fell in love with Dr. Clifford Jones. Marrying Jones and following him to the Amazon on an expedition, Jo left a saddened Doctor.

The fiercely independent investigative journalist Sarah Jane Smith became the Doctor's new companion after stowing away in his TARDIS. The Third Doctor's final adventures saw them defeating the Sontarans in medieval England and the Daleks on the planet Exxilon. The Third Doctor contracted radiation poisoning on the planet Metebelis 3, during the events of Planet of the Spiders. When the TARDIS brought him back to UNIT headquarters, he collapsed, regenerating into the Fourth Doctor.

== Personality ==
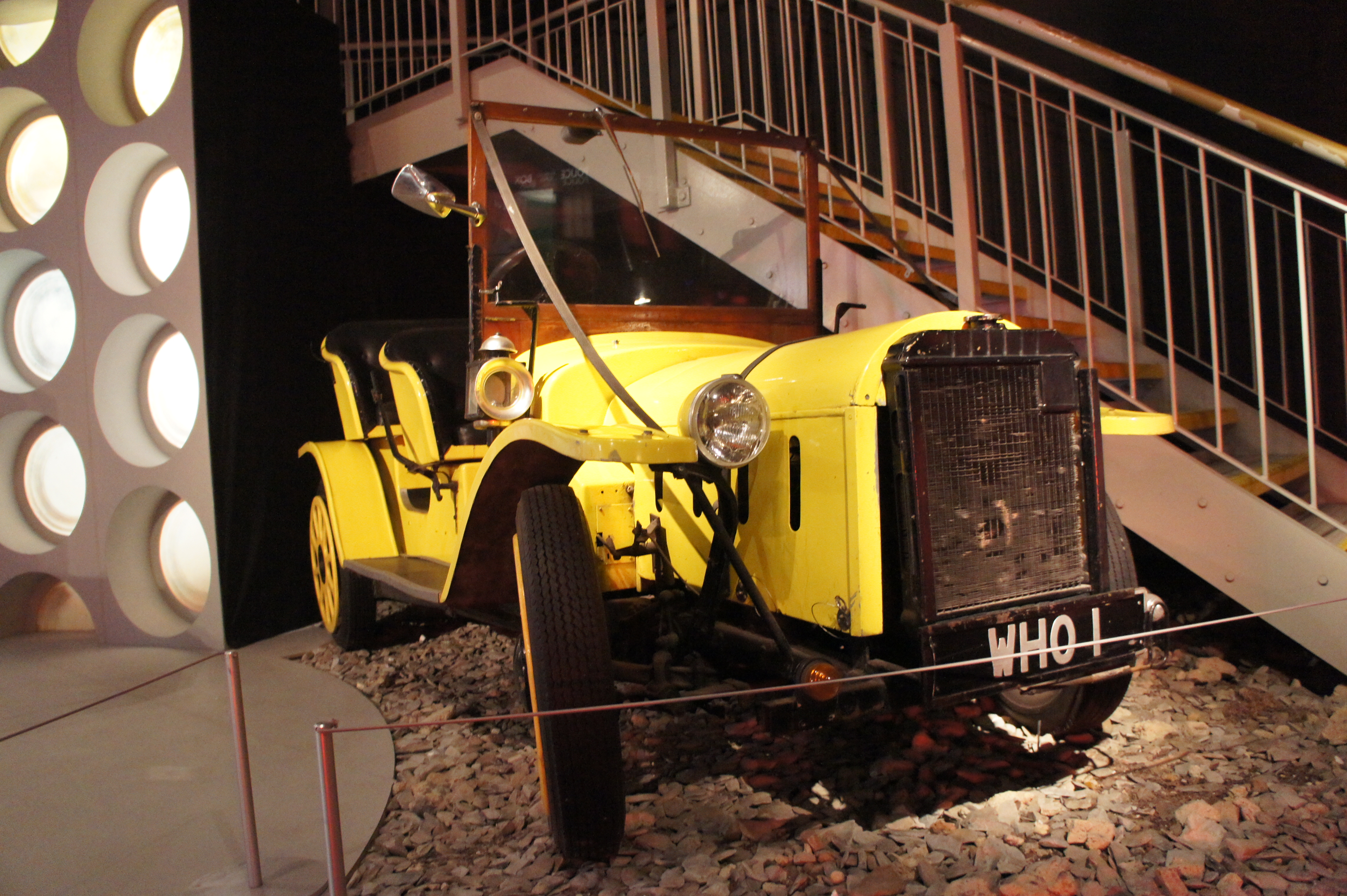
Bessie, the car driven by the Third Doctor on display at the Doctor Who Experience in 2015

The Third Doctor was a suave, dapper, technologically orientated and authoritative man of action who practised Venusian Aikido. A keen scientist, he maintained a laboratory at UNIT where he enjoyed working on gadgets in his TARDIS. In his spare time, he was fond of motoring, handling all manner of vehicles. His favourite car was a canary-yellow Siva Motor Car Company tourer that he nicknamed "Bessie", a machine which featured such modifications as a remote control, dramatically increased speed capabilities and inertial dampers. He also maintained a hovercraft-like vessel that fans nicknamed the Whomobile. The First Doctor, upon meeting the Third, described him indignantly as a "dandy", while the Second Doctor, with whom the Third had something of an antagonistic relationship on the occasions they encountered each other, referred to him as "Fancy Pants".

While this incarnation spent most of his time exiled on Earth—grudgingly working as UNIT's scientific advisor—he was occasionally sent on covert missions by the Time Lords, where he would often act as a reluctant mediator. Even though he developed a fondness for Earthlings with whom he worked (such as Liz Shaw and Jo Grant), he jumped at any chance to return to the stars. Though he had a somewhat patrician and authoritarian air, he was quick to criticise authority, and often exclaimed "Now listen to me!" when dealing with people seeking to obstruct him.

Despite his occasional arrogance, the Third Doctor genuinely cared for his companions in a paternal fashion, and even held a thinly veiled but grudging admiration for his nemesis, the Master, and for UNIT's leader, Brigadier Lethbridge-Stewart, with whom he eventually became friends. In fact, even when his much-resented exile was lifted, the moral and dashing Third Doctor continued to help UNIT protect the Earth from all manner of alien threats, a role that continued into his future incarnations.

In general, this incarnation of the Doctor was more physically daring than the previous two and was the first to confront an enemy physically if cornered (both of his previous incarnations nearly always attempted to dodge, flee or negotiate rather than attack). This often took the form of quick strikes, with the occasional joint lock or throw — usually enough to get himself and anyone accompanying him out of immediate danger, but usually not to the extent of a brawl, in keeping with the Doctor's non-violent nature. He only used his fighting skills if he had no alternative, and even then generally disarmed his opponents rather than knocking them unconscious. Indeed, his martial prowess was such that a single, sudden strike was usually enough to halt whatever threatened him, and at one point he reminded Captain Yates of UNIT (physically as well as verbally) that Yates would have a difficult time removing him from somewhere when he did not want to be removed (The Mind of Evil).

The Third Doctor was a skilled diplomat (keeping talks going in The Curse of Peladon, for example) and linguist, as well as having a penchant for disguises.

=== Appearance ===
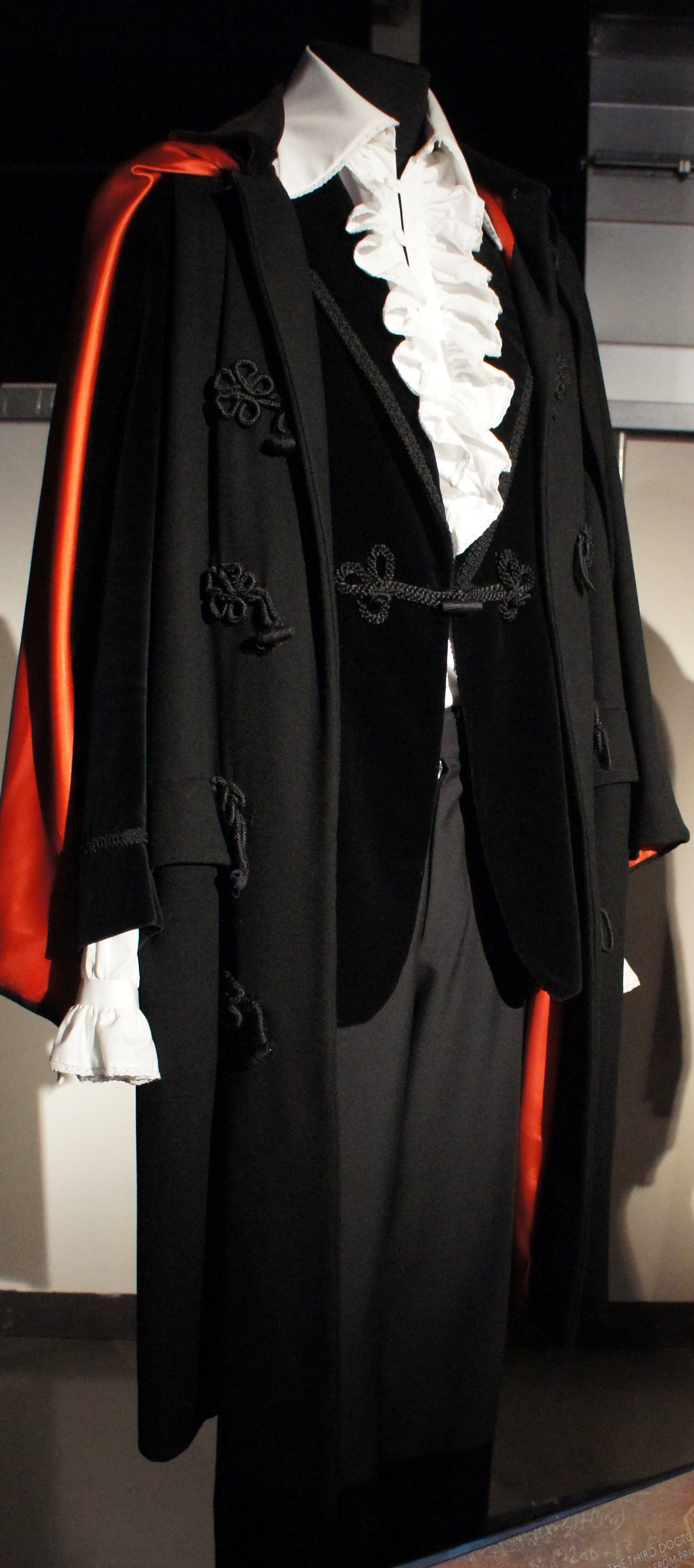
The Third Doctor's costume of a ruffled shirt, velvet smoking jacket and cape, exhibited at the Doctor Who Experience in 2015

When asked to attend a Radio Times photo-call in 1969, Jon Pertwee arrived in what he thought was "a suitably eccentric outfit" from his family wardrobe, and the flamboyant image stuck with producer Barry Letts. Through the first season, he wore a flowing, crimson or red lined cape (which he alternated) over a very dark blue velvet smoking jacket (which often looked black in certain lighting) and a ruffled shirt with a variety of neckties such as jabots, bow ties or cravats. Beginning in the 1971 season, when the look was refashioned by Ken Trew, Pertwee alternated between the dark blue, red or green jacket and a cloak with purple lining, although sometimes the red lining cloak would be used. In the final two seasons, the colour scheme changed from story to story, though the basic look was maintained.

In his first episode, when the Doctor evades capture by taking a shower, an image of a serpent can be seen on his arm. This was a tattoo that Pertwee had obtained during his service in the Royal Navy; an in-universe reason for it was eventually provided in the New Adventures novel Christmas on a Rational Planet as being a Time Lord mark indicating an individual currently in exile. It indicates that the mark was removed once the Doctor's exile was formally ended following the events of The Three Doctors.

== Story style ==
The Third Doctor stories were the first to be broadcast in colour. The early ones were set on Earth because he had been exiled there when the Second Doctor was banished to Earth by his people, the Time Lords, and forced to regenerate. On Earth, he worked with the Brigadier and the rest of the UNIT team. However, as his tenure progressed he had reasons to leave Earth, on occasion being sent on missions by the Time Lords. Eventually, after his defeat of the renegade Omega in The Three Doctors, he was granted complete freedom by the Time Lords in gratitude for saving Gallifrey.

The Third Doctor's era introduced adversaries including the Autons, the Master, Omega, the Sontarans, the Silurians and the Sea Devils. The Daleks returned after a five-year absence about halfway through Pertwee's run. The Third Doctor was the only one from the classic series not to have a story featuring the Cybermen (although they were seen briefly in The Mind of Evil and Carnival of Monsters), but he did eventually encounter them during "The Five Doctors".

== "Reverse the polarity of the neutron flow" ==
A catchphrase devised during the Third Doctor's era was "reverse the polarity of the neutron flow". Terrance Dicks recalls that he had used the line in a script, and Pertwee approached him about the line. Knowing that Pertwee struggled with technobabble in the role, Dicks had feared that he would have to remove the line, but Pertwee stated that he found it manageable and wanted to see it more often.

The Third Doctor only said the full phrase "reverse the polarity of the neutron flow" twice on screen – in The Sea Devils (1972) and the 20th Anniversary special "The Five Doctors" (1983), with numerous other examples of "reverse the polarity" and earlier instances of "fusing the control of the neutron flow" and "change the polarity". Pertwee used the phrase when he acted in the stage play Doctor Who – The Ultimate Adventure in 1989. When Colin Baker took over the role in the play he amended the line to "Reverse the linearity of the proton flow." In the radio play The Paradise of Death, the Brigadier asks "Reverse the polarity of the neutron flow?" and the Doctor proceeds to explain that the phrase is meaningless (though in reality neutrons can be polarized by a magnetic field, such that reversing the magnetic field's direction reverses the polarity of the neutrons).

The full phrase was used in several Target novelisations. It was subsequently used by the Fourth Doctor (in City of Death) and the Fifth Doctor (in Castrovalva and Mawdryn Undead). Together with "The Five Doctors", this resulted in the phrase being used as a nostalgic reference. In the Tenth Doctor episode "The Lazarus Experiment", the Doctor, while hiding in Lazarus' machine, comments that it has taken him too long to reverse the polarity due to being out of practice. The Tenth Doctor uses the full phrase in "Music of the Spheres".

During the episode "The Almost People", a clone of the Eleventh Doctor speaks the phrase while reliving the memories of all his predecessors. He goes on to conflate it with his regeneration-spanning love of jelly babies, remarking that they need to "reverse the jelly baby of the neutron flow". In "The Day of the Doctor", the Eleventh Doctor invokes the phrase when confronting a time portal with the Tenth Doctor, suggesting that they both "reverse the polarity" with their sonic screwdrivers (which merely neutralizes each other's efforts). In "The Girl Who Died", the Twelfth Doctor tells Clara Oswald he is "Reversing the polarity of the neutron flow", followed by "I bet that means something. It sounds great." Clara herself uses the phrase, saying she "reversed the polarity" of a mind-wiping device to prevent the Doctor from erasing her memories of him from her mind ("Hell Bent"). In "It Takes You Away", Yaz Khan suggests that the Thirteenth Doctor reverse the polarity on the sonic screwdriver in order to (successfully) open a locked inter-universe portal.

== Title sequence and logo ==
The Doctor Who logo introduced in 1970 for the Third Doctor's television serials

The original title sequence for the Third Doctor's seasons introduced colour and was an extension of the "howlaround" kaleidoscopic patterns used for the previous Doctors. It features red, black then green flaming hands, then shows Jon Pertwee's face followed by a series of swirling lines to represent the time vortex. As the vortex turns red it speeds up only to start reversing, and in some cases it is seen turning pink and yellow. In the Third Doctor's final season, a new title sequence was introduced using a full-body picture of Pertwee, designed by Bernard Lodge. Partially inspired by the slit-scan hyperspace sequence in Stanley Kubrick's 2001: A Space Odyssey, one portion of this sequence is the prototype for the time tunnel sequence of the Fourth Doctor's seasons. The Third Doctor's final season also introduced the diamond logo which would remain in use until 1980 and be revived in 2022.

The series logo introduced in 1970 and used for the first four seasons of Pertwee's tenure would later be used again, in modified form, as the logo for the 1996 Doctor Who TV movie. This version subsequently became the official Doctor Who logo, most notably with regards to products connected to the Eighth Doctor. With the introduction of a new official series logo in 2005, the 1996 logo continued to be used by Big Finish Productions as the logo for all pre-2005 series material including books and audio dramas, and by the BBC on DVD releases of episodes from the 1963–89 series, books and audio.

== Later appearances ==
The Third Doctor appeared again in the 20th anniversary special "The Five Doctors", broadcast in 1983. A stage play, Doctor Who – The Ultimate Adventure, was produced in 1989, starring Jon Pertwee (occasionally replaced by an understudy then later, until the end of the production run, by Colin Baker as the Sixth Doctor). In 1993, he played the role again for the 30th Anniversary charity special Dimensions in Time, and in the audio drama The Paradise of Death. Months before his death, he played the Doctor for the final time in the audio drama The Ghosts of N-Space.

From 2015, Big Finish had produced a new series of audio drama adventures featuring the Third Doctor titled The Third Doctor Adventures, with Tim Treloar voicing the role.

== Other mentions ==
Visions of the Third Doctor appear in The Brain of Morbius, Mawdryn Undead, and Resurrection of the Daleks. A portrait of him is seen in Timelash. A brief clip of the Third Doctor taken from Terror of the Autons appears in "The Next Doctor", another appears in The Sarah Jane Adventures serial The Mad Woman in the Attic as a flashback, and visions appear in "The Eleventh Hour", "The Lodger", "Nightmare in Silver", "Twice Upon a Time", "The Timeless Children", "Rogue", "The Story & The Engine", "Wish World", "The Reality War" and The Sarah Jane Adventures serial Death of the Doctor. He was also seen in the episode "The Name of the Doctor" driving Bessie (taken from "The Five Doctors"), and archival footage was used for his appearance in "The Day of the Doctor".

== Other appearances ==
See List of non-televised Third Doctor stories.
