= Warship (1973 TV series) =

1973 British drama TV series

- Genre: Action drama
- Created by: Ian Mackintosh and Anthony Coburn
- Written by: Ian Mackintosh and others
- Directed by: Michael E. Briant and others
- Theme music composer: Anthony Isaac
- Country of origin: United Kingdom
- Original language: English
- No. of series: 4
- No. of episodes: 45

Production
- Producers: Anthony Coburn and Joe Waters
- Running time: 50 minutes

Original release
- Network: BBC1
- Release: 7 June 1973 – 29 March 1977

Warship is a British television drama series produced by the BBC and broadcast from 1973 to 1977. The series was set contemporaneously and depicted life on board the fictitious Royal Navy frigate HMS Hero. Four series were produced with 45 episodes made in total.

It was also subtitled into Dutch and broadcast in the Netherlands as Alle hens aan dek (All hands on deck) and besides Britain was popular in Ireland, Australia, New Zealand and Singapore.

== Plot ==
The episodes were written and filmed to reflect the reality of life in the Royal Navy and the Royal Marines in the 1970s. The primary focus for most stories was on the Captain and his fellow officers, but the series also featured life on the lower decks to portray episodes heavily featuring ratings. Episodes featured a variety of events at sea (the Cold War, smuggling, the evacuation of civilians from crisis-hit places, etc.), as well as the personal lives of officers and ratings and the impact their personal lives had on their professional lives and duties.

== Cast ==
Over the course of the series HMS Hero's crew changes periodically. Only two officers, Kiley and Wakelin, remain with the ship for the whole series. The main characters in most episodes were the captain and his first lieutenant, plus the Master-at-Arms and/or his Leading Regulator ("Sheriff") who led the ship's combat force.

=== Hero's crew ===
==== Captains ====
- Donald Burton as Commander Mark Nialls, OBE (series 1–2)
- Bryan Marshall as Commander Alan Douglas Glenn, AFC (series 3)
- Derek Godfrey as Captain Edward Kelvin Holt (series 4)

==== First Lieutenants ====
- David Savile as Lieutenant Commander Derek "Porky" Beaumont ("Number One") (series 1–3)
- Robert Morris as Lieutenant Commander James Napier, GM ("Number One") (series 4)

Other officers

- John Lee as Lieutenant Commander Bill Kiley, weapons and electrics officer ("WEO", pronounced "We-Oh")
- Graeme Eton as Lieutenant Montgomery Charles "Monty" Wakelin, supply officer
- Norman Eshley as Lieutenant Bob Last, navigating officer ("Pilot") (series 1–2)
- Andrew Burt as Lieutenant Paul Peek, navigating officer ("Pilot") (series 3–4)
- Christopher Coll as Lieutenant Peter Boswall, flight commander ("Flight") (series 1)
- James Leith as Lieutenant Roy Tagg, flight commander ("Flight") (series 3)
- Richard Warwick as Lieutenant Parry (series 1)
- Rex Robinson as Lieutenant Commander Jack Junnion, engineer officer ("Chief" or "CME - Chief Marine Engineer") (series 1). Junnion wears the badge of a submarine officer in his few appearances in formal uniform vs coveralls.

==== Ratings ====
- Don Henderson as Master-at-Arms Frank Heron (series 1–3). Joined the Royal Navy at 16, devastated when the RN wouldn't keep him on past 20 years' service, but elects to serve out his remaining time in Hero.
- Frank Jarvis as Master-at-Arms Harry Burnett (series 3–4)
- James Cosmo as Leading Regulator Pat Fuller, GM ("Sheriff")
- Nigel Humphreys as Leading Seaman Anderson
- Steve Gardner as Able Seaman Billy Grogan
- Colin Rix as Leading Medical Assistant Milner

=== Recurring characters ===
- Donald Hewlett as Rear Admiral Mulliner/Staunton
- Peter Cellier as Captain Reginald St Vincent Calder, Squadron Commander
- Marian Diamond as Sue Herrick, Glenn's girlfriend (series 3)
- Prunella Ransome as Zoe Carter, Holt's girlfriend (series 4)

== Royal Navy and Royal Australian Navy co-operation ==
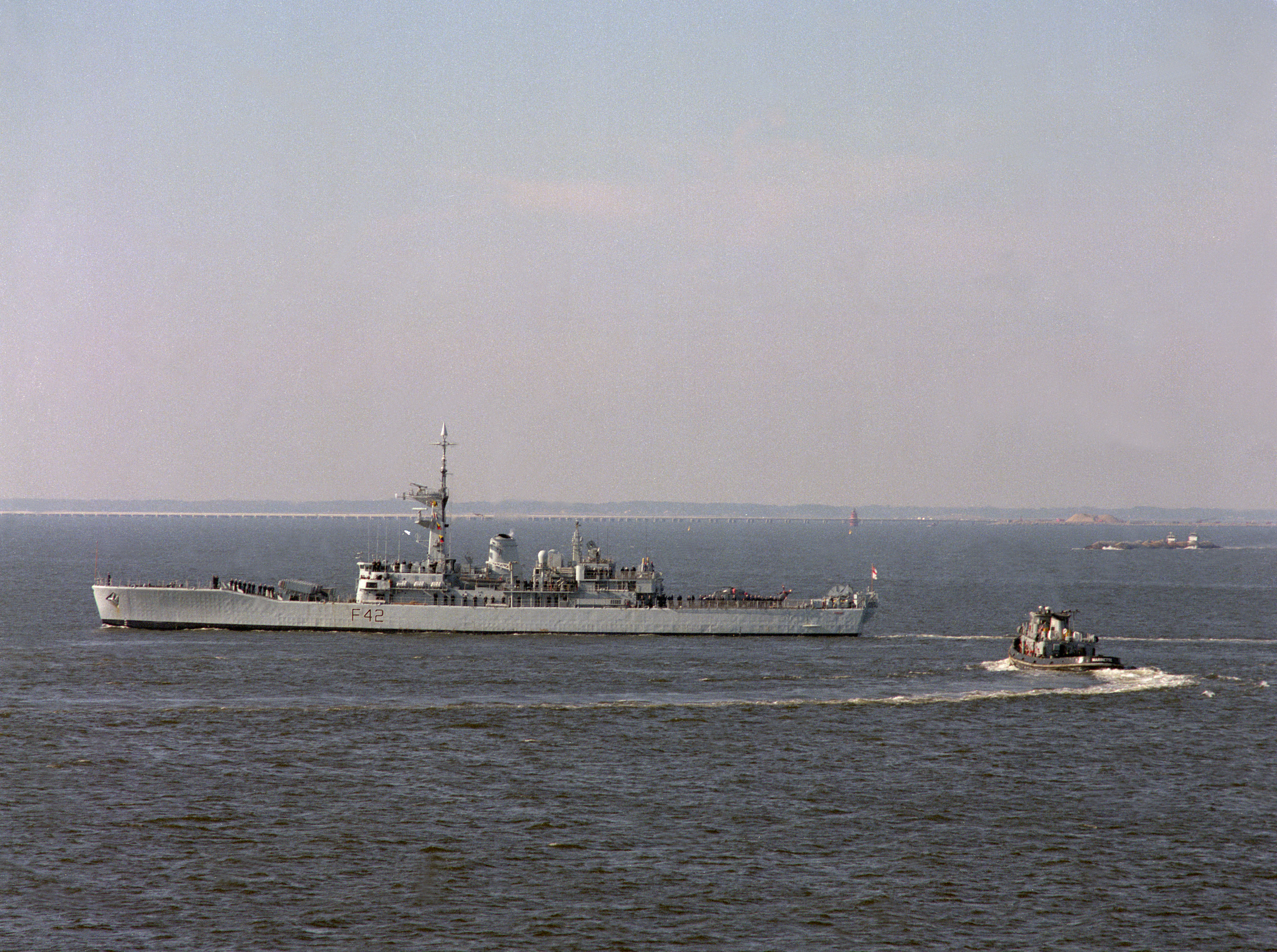
HMS Phoebe, one of the frigates which was the fictional HMS Hero

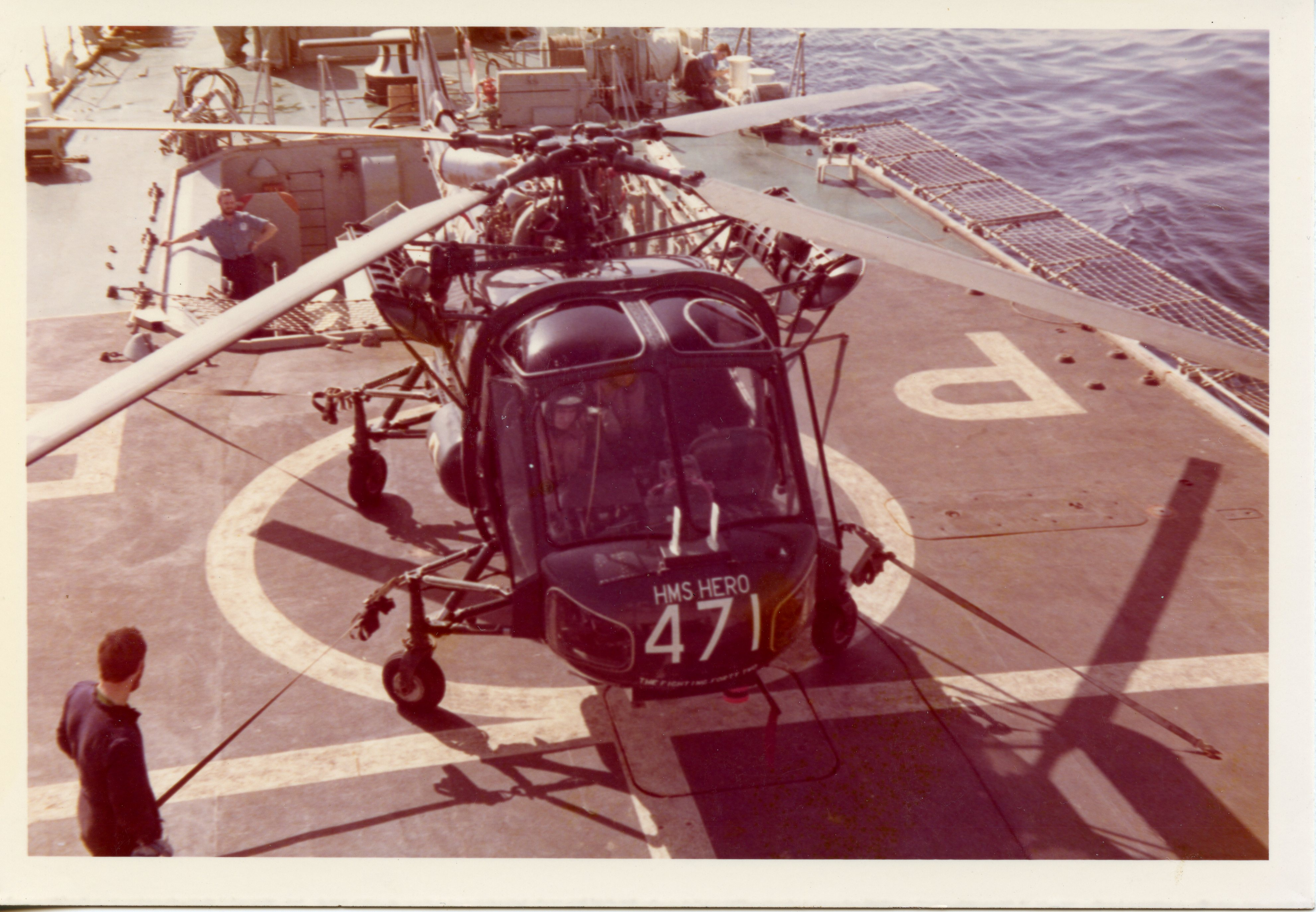
Westland Wasp 471 - February 1973

The series enjoyed close collaboration between the Royal Navy and the BBC, and—unusually for a TV drama of the 1970s—looked like a documentary. Seven Leander-class frigates played the role of HMS Hero and for continuity, all were repainted with the pennant number F42 of HMS Phoebe, the main warship used for filming. The others were HMS Danae, HMS Dido, HMS Diomede, HMS Hermione, HMS Juno and HMS Jupiter. The name HMS Hero was chosen as Hero was the lover of Leander in classical mythology and no real Leander-class frigate used the name (though the name had been used previously by six Royal Navy warships).

HMAS Derwent, a River-class destroyer escort of the Royal Australian Navy, was also used as Hero for some scenes filmed in 1976 in Hong Kong and Singapore. This Australian link and Australian broadcasts of Warship influenced the production of the later and similar Australian Broadcasting Corporation series Patrol Boat.

The crews of these frigates - and Derwent - were given Hero cap tallies for filming purposes, and their ships were given HMS Hero ships' badges, name plates and lifebuoys. Similarly, their Westland Wasp helicopters from the Fleet Air Arm's 829 Naval Air Squadron were all repainted with the identification HMS Hero, the code 471, and the nickname "The Fighting Forty-Two". Among the Wasps used for the fictional Hero Flight were serial numbers XT419 from HMS Phoebe's Flight, XV625, and XV626. (One of these Wasps, XV625 still painted with the 471 code, is preserved at HMS Sultan in the Royal Naval Air Engineering and Survival School.) These measures, along with the use by all the frigates of the pennant number F42, had the unintended side effect of confusing Soviet spy ships.

Other Royal Navy warships used for the series included the aircraft carrier HMS Ark Royal, the helicopter cruiser HMS Blake, the commando carrier HMS Bulwark and the submarine HMS Andrew. The Royal Marine Commandos took part in the series, as also did the Fleet Air Arm, the Royal Naval Reserve in the shape of the Ton-class minesweeper HMS Fittleton, the Royal Fleet Auxiliary in the shape of RFA Reliant, RFA Grey Rover and other ships, and the Royal Maritime Auxiliary Service.

Fleet Air Arm squadrons embarked on HMS Ark Royal used for filming included the Buccaneer S 2s of 809 Naval Air Squadron and the Phantom FG 1s of 892 Naval Air Squadron. The Westland Wessex HU 5s of 845 Naval Air Squadron embarked on HMS Bulwark also featured in some episodes.

The series was also filmed ashore in, among other places, Gibraltar, Malta, Hong Kong, Singapore, north-east of Isfjellet in Loppa and Larvik in Norway, the Admiralty Experiment Works in Haslar, RNAS Predannack, Portland Harbour, Plymouth Dockyard, Portsmouth Dockyard and South Uist.

== Theme music ==
The opening and closing music of the series were taken from a march called Warship, composed for the series by Anthony Isaac. The theme was played by the Band of the Royal Marines, Deal, conducted by Lieutenant Colonel Paul Neville, MVO, FRAM, RM. (See links to files of opening and closing music below.)

The march is still played by Royal Marine bands and the Royal Australian Navy Band. The theme influenced the opening bars of a 2010 march, Scrap Iron Flotilla, composed by Leading Seaman Martyn Hancock of the Royal Australian Navy Band.

Warship was chosen as one of the pieces performed to mark the 75th and 100th anniversaries of the founding of the Royal Australian Navy Band. Writing in the Centenary Concert Music Program in 2013, the Royal Australian Navy's then-Director of Music, Lieutenant Commander Paul Cottier, said that:

"Warship is a fine example of the influence television and film were having on the repertoire of military bands at that time, which were beginning to see a change in direction from military music and orchestral transcriptions to more popular and contemporary music."'

== Series creators ==
The originator of the idea for the series and main script editor was a serving Royal Navy officer, Ian Mackintosh, who worked with BBC producer Anthony Coburn after Mackintosh originally approached the BBC in May 1971. Coburn had for some years wanted to produce a series "that would do for the Navy what Z-Cars had done for the Police". Apart from Mackintosh, other scriptwriters included Michael J. Bird, and the series was directed by Michael E. Briant among others. Mackintosh was seconded to the BBC for the series, and was awarded the MBE for his work on Warship in 1976.

== Warship and Blue Peter ==
In 1975 the BBC's children's television programme Blue Peter included a feature about the filming of Warship at Plymouth Dockyard aboard HMS Danae; the item was presented by Lesley Judd. The next year, future Blue Peter presenter Peter Duncan played a major role in the episode "All of One Company". Six episodes of Warship were filmed aboard HMS Danae around that time.

== Warship assessed in retrospect ==
Writing in 2006, historian Professor S.P. MacKenzie judged that:

"Warship had succeeded where Making Waves failed because those involved – the multi-talented Ian Mackintosh above all – managed to create varied and interesting characters and plots in which RN frigates and other vessels served as useful backdrops for the action. Warship, in short, helped the Royal Navy through a combination of competent writing, acting and direction rather more than through using its equipment as a showcase. (...) Mackintosh and those around him knew how to draw in the viewer with stories that were both contemporary and interesting." (Broadcasting the New Navy: the BBC-TV Series Warship (1973–1977), p.119)

Making Waves was a 2004 series made by ITV, and intended to be in the same vein as Warship. It proved less successful, and only three episodes were shown out of the six that were made.

In 2022 the British Forces Broadcasting Service noted that Warship was "extremely popular ... and it is still fondly remembered to this day".

== Products based on Warship ==
=== Books ===
Ian Mackintosh wrote three books based on the series, which were simultaneously published in hardback and paperback. The books were:

- Warship (published in 1973)
- HMS Hero (published in 1976)
- Holt RN (published in 1977) – same story as episode 4.01 "Wind Song"

=== Board game ===
Series creator Ian Mackintosh also devised a version of the board game Battleships, based on his experience of modern naval tactics and called Warship after the series. It was produced by Merit Toys in 1976, in association with the BBC.

=== Scale model kit ===
Airfix sold its plastic 1/600 scale model kit of HMS Leander with the tag line "Featured as HMS Hero in the BBC TV series Warship".

=== Theme music single ===
Columbia Records released a 7-inch single (catalogue reference DB 8998) of the theme music (see above) in 1973. As in the TV series the theme was played by the Band of the Royal Marines, Deal, conducted by Lieutenant Colonel Paul Neville, MVO, FRAM, RM.

=== Availability on DVD ===
Series 1 of Warship was released on DVD by Simply Media on 15 September 2014, with Series 2 released on 9 November 2015.

Series 3 and 4 had been due for release in different months during 2016, but these releases were cancelled due to "unforeseen clearance issues". Series 3 and 4 remain unreleased on DVD.

== Episodes ==
=== Series 1 ===
No.	Title	Written by	Original release date
1–01	"Hot Pursuit"	Martin Worth	7 June 1973
HMS Hero is undergoing a self-maintenance period in Gibraltar after several months without a captain or first lieutenant. After the arrival of Lieutenant Commander Beaumont and Commander Nialls, a random incident with a crew member in a bar leads to a civilian ship suspected of gun running. When the ship leaves port with its cargo, HMS Hero takes pursuit and forces the ship to stop in international waters, where the doctrine of hot pursuit is explained to its crew. Guest cast: Rex Robinson as Lieutenant-Commander Junnion, Christopher Coll as Lieutenant Boswall, Bruce Boa as McFie, Gaye Brown as Janet McFie, James Garbutt as Munro, Hugh Latimer as Rear Admiral Cardine, Brian Jameson as Leading Steward Brown, Jon Laurimore as Superintendent Bellamy, Mike Lewin as Sergeant Woods, Nicholas McArdle as O'Leary, Carlos Douglas as barman, Laurie Webb as customs officer, Roy Evans as Cook Meadows.
1–02	"Nobody Said Frigate"	Donald Bull	14 June 1973
Hero arriving at Malta is reassigned at short notice to pick up a defecting Russian diplomat from the North African coast. The risking of a frigate and its crew of over 200 causes questioning of the "request" down the line of command, with each man aware that his superior will abandon him if anything goes wrong. Although the foreign coast guard detects and responds to the intrusion with a surveillance helicopter and MTB, Hero collects the Russian and escapes without injury, although it turns out that he may be of little value. In the repercussions, a government official says "it was expected to be a simple submarine operation, nobody said frigate". Guest cast: Christopher Coll as Lieutenant Boswall, Richard Marner as Trepanov, Peter Miles as Taliah, John Savident as Admiral Norris, Barrie Cookson as 'C', Donald Hewlett as Rear Admiral Mulliner, McDonald Hobley as Chief of the Defence Staff, Alec Wallis as Chief Petty Officer Bates, Ian Judge as Pettigrew, Robert Mill as Knox Palmer, Mark Elwes as naval liaison officer, Frank Jarvis as Chief Petty Officer Jones, Leo Dolan as docker, Leslie Southwick as Archibald, Nadim Sawalha as Arab pilot, Ahmed Osman as Arab operator one, Albert Moses as Arab operator two, Joanna Royce as Russian Secretary, Pat Gorman as ops room operator.
1–03	"Off Caps"	Manus Hardy	21 June 1973
Hero is assigned at short notice to take part in a naval exercise. Stores accountant Rabbits who had been planning to visit his pregnant wife but now cannot leave the ship, receives a letter in which she says she is depressed and thinking of getting rid of the baby. Meanwhile, Marine Engineering Mechanic (stoker) Cutler and his chief Slater come into conflict, climaxing when Cutler lashes out and kicks Slater in the head. Rabbits sabotages a bearing in the ship's propulsion system with an oil dispersing agent, forcing Hero to withdraw to Gibraltar on one engine. At Cutler's on-board trial, he is accused of both assault and sabotage. However, evidence implicating Rabbits is found. Cutler is cleared of both charges and Rabbits is convicted instead. Guest cast: Rex Robinson as Lieutenant-Commander Junnion, Christopher Coll as Lieutenant Boswall, Charles Bolton as Bunny, Brian Peck as Tolliday, Victor Winding as Slater, Andrew McCulloch as Cutler, Roger Tallon as Barnes, Stephen Stacey as Loftus, David Troughton as Doc Pitman, Mark Griffith as Blackie.
1–04	"Funny, They All Say That"	Ian Mackintosh	28 June 1973
Petty Officer Willows leaves the ship to sort out the debts run up by his oniomaniac wife. While at home, he is approached by a foreign agent who impersonates naval security, obtaining a confession for smuggling and then blackmailing him into becoming a spy. Back on the ship, he photographs documentation for a new submarine detection system. However, when Nialls finds out about his debts, he has him transferred off the ship and calls in the real naval security for further investigation. Guest cast: Frederick Jaeger as Spooner, Tony Selby as PO WTR. Willows, Kara Wilson as Angela, Billy Hamon as WTR. Parkins, Sheila Beckett as Mrs. Willows, Leonard Kingston as Erwin.
1–05	"The Drop"	Robert Holmes	5 July 1973
With Hero at Malta, Chief petty officer Donovan, who previously had criminal dealings with a man named Spiro, goes ashore to recover his money, which he had left in the hands of his girlfriend Gina. However Gina is now living with Spiro and between them they have disposed of it. Gina's death is faked and Donovan is threatened with being framed for the "murder" if he doesn't deliver an advanced electronic valve from Hero. He is caught with the valve while leaving the ship, but the British intelligence services want the delivery to go ahead in an attempt to capture a Soviet scientist. The scientist turns out to be a woman who has been socialising with the officers of Hero, but she evades capture. Guest cast: Donald Hewlett as Rear Admiral Mulliner, Tony Steedman as Flynn, Rio Fanning as Chief Petty Officer Donovan, Alec Mango as Savona, Nicolette McKenzie as Vera Cesnik, Peter Birrel as Spiro, Mary Webster as Gina, Julian Curry as Lieutenant Commander Padden, Richard Aylen as Large, Terry Bale as C.P.O. Watson, David Purcell as Chief, Gino Melvazzi as Tony.
1–06	"The Prize"	Mervyn Haisman	12 July 1973
Hero encounters an abandoned freighter at sea off the regular shipping lanes. A boarding party searches the ship and discovers explosive charges set to go off, but as they leave the ship, AB Drew falls off a ladder below decks and suffers a potential back injury, making him difficult to move. Beaumont and Master-at-arms Heron defuse a plastic explosive, a limpet mine and a depth charge, the latter with the help of the appointed explosives expert Lieutenant Parry, who turns out to be terrified of the job. Hero takes the freighter in tow, which will allow the crew to share the salvage prize and thwart the presumed insurance fraud. Guest cast: Richard Warwick as Lieutenant Parry, Dennis Blanch as AB Tom Drew, Steve Gardner as AB Billy Grogan, Karl Howman as AB Mick Turner, William Maxwell as AB Porky Walker, Paul Haley as LMA 'Doc' Peters.
1–07	"Subsmash"	Stuart Douglass	19 July 1973
Hero takes part in an exercise with the submarine HMS Omega. ABs Wallace and Pomeroy from Hero go aboard Omega as visitors. Omega attempts to hide from Hero by bottoming on the sea floor at 160 feet. However, it strikes a WW2 mine and its accommodation compartment is holed. Once the compartment is sealed off, Wallace and Pomeroy are trapped in the forward torpedo bay. With the sub unable to surface and the aft escape tower out of service, the only option for survival is for divers from Hero to repair the hole. Pomeroy panics and attempts to flood the torpedo bay and use the forward escape tower, an action that would doom the submarine's crew, but is physically restrained by Wallace. Once the hole has been patched, the submarine safely surfaces. Guest cast: Richard Warwick as Lieutenant Parry, Christopher Coll as Lieutenant Boswall, Denis Lill as Lieutenant Commander Aubrey, Paul Chapman as Lieutenant Grieve, Anton Phillips as A. B. Wallace, Graham Simpson as A. B. Pomeroy, Colin McCormack as Petty Officer James, Robert Aldous as Chief Petty Officer HMS Omega, Russel Denton as A. B. Selby, Peter Winter as Navigating Officer, HMS Omega, Oliver Gilbert as Comms Rating, HMS Hero, Peter Messaline as E. R. A., HMS Omega, Kenneth Kennedy as Helmsman, HMS Omega, David Hayward as Afterplanesman, HMS Omega.
1–08	"A Standing And Jumping War"	John Wiles	2 August 1973
Hero arrives at Hafsidia, the capital of the Arabic-speaking state of Hafsidia. Its government has heard rumours that Britain is considering selling a frigate to Israel, and demands that Britain promise never to do such a thing, with a threat to seize Hero if a deadline is not met. When Nialls hears that Britain will reject the demand, he must arrange an escape, with the assistance of a British agent named Tashing. Replacement engine oil is floated across the harbour at night, 22 of Hero's sailors are rescued from detention onshore, and Hero evades guards on the wharf, artillery pieces, a mined boom across the harbour, a gunboat, and two approaching (presumably Russian) frigates. Lieutenant Parry is killed by a rifle shot from shore, but Hero heads for a liaison with her sister ship HMS Phoebe. Guest cast: Richard Warwick as Lieutenant Parry, Rex Robinson as Lieutenant Commander Junnion, Anthony Ainley as Phillip Tashing, Angus Mackay as Colin Bennett, Patricia Prior as Diana Bennett, Arnold Diamond as Minister Aziz, Ronald Chenery as Captain Ferhat, Bob Babenia as carpet seller, Yakar Semach as gun boat captain, Leslie Tucker as newsreader, Yashar Adem as Arab officer.
1–09	"Shoresides And Home"	Alun Richards	9 August 1973
With Hero at Gibraltar, Master-at-Arms Frank Heron applies for extended service, but is shocked when it is rejected. He argues with his girlfriend Maura who is returning to England. Also in port is HMS Boadicea, commanded by Commander Murton, who Heron blames for putting a black mark on his record. At an on-shore party, Murton argues with his own girlfriend, Peggy Carter, who he wants to break up with. A drunk Heron arrives to confront Murton, but he is taken back to the ship. Murton and Nialls, drunk, make a bet of £500 over which ship can get back to England first. Nialls tells Heron to pull himself together. Murton sabotages Niall's chances by having him delayed at the base, but Nialls phones Peggy Carter, who arranges for her connections to send Boadicea on a bogus assignment, allowing Nialls to win the bet. Back in England, Heron is apparently marrying Maura. Guest cast: Malcolm Terris as Commander Murton, Heather Canning as Maura, Patricia Mort as Peggy Carter, David Neal as Lieutenant Commander Hopwood, Forbes Collins as Master at Arms Wilson, Ron Pember as Adge, Richard Hampton as Flag Lieutenant, Terence Sewards as The Major, Peter Longbow as Fleet Operations Officer, Jonathan Gardner as Leading Writer, Maurice Quick as Flag Officer, Gibraltar.

=== Series 2 (1974) ===
No.	Title	Written by	Original release date
2–01	"The Raid"	Allan Prior	15 October 1974
Hero is under battle conditions, after a hostile force has invaded northern Norway. On board is a squad of Royal Marine Commandos led by Lieutenant Palfrey, whose father was a highly decorated WWII general. Deployed from Hero to blow up an enemy radar station ashore, the squad is captured and Palfrey taken for questioning. He explodes when compared unfavourably to his famous father, breaks his interrogator's neck, and escapes into the countryside. The final minutes of the episode reveal that the entire scenario was a NATO training exercise, and Palfrey has killed a Norwegian Army officer - and now the Army, the police, and Commander Nialls have to find him. Guest cast: Michael Cochrane as Lieutenant Palfrey, RM, David Sterne as Sergeant Watkins, Kenneth Scott as Corporal Blundell, Steve Gardner as Able Seaman Grogan, Frederick Treves as The Major, Geoffrey Toone as General Tiering
2–02	"Without Just Cause"	Allan Prior	22 October 1974
Lieutenant Palfrey escapes his pursuers and returns to Hero where he speaks with Nialls. Nialls persuades the Norwegians to allow him to be court-martialled in England. He pleads not guilty but is convicted of manslaughter, but after Nialls speaks as a character witness he is sentenced to only 18 months imprisonment and discharge from the service, but giving the Admiralty Board the option to remit the discharge and suspend the imprisonment. Guest cast: Michael Cochrane as Lt. Palfrey R.M., Philip Bond as Commander Hilliard, Frank Duncan as Mr. Cook, Helen Lindsay as Angela Palfrey, Geoffrey Toone as General Tiering, Frederick Treves as The Major, David Sterne as Sergeant Watkins, Kenneth Scott as Corporal Blundell, Paul Williamson as Judge Advocate, Arnold Peters as President of the Court, David Goodland as Officer of the Court, Kenneth Shaw as The Norwegian A.D.C.
2–03	"Who Run Across The Sea"	Ian Mackintosh	29 October 1974
An Arab guerrilla unit hijacks a British fleet auxiliary armament stores ship in the North Atlantic, which is carrying Polaris nuclear warheads. Hero as the closest warship is sent to intervene. The hijackers refuse to stop the ship, threatening to kill the crew. When they refuse to negotiate, and even refuse orders from their own political leaders to surrender, Nialls is ordered to sink the ship. However, he first fires a few mortar bombs near the bow, and the hijackers finally agree to surrender. Guest cast: Sean Lynch as Zardi, Kevin Stoney as Captain Ragg, Julian Holloway as Chief Officer O'Morra, Anne Raitt as Luna, David Ashley as Ahmed, John Savident as First Sea Lord, John Quarmby as Defence Secretary, Anthony Langdon as Minister of State, Keith Smith as D.N.O.T.
2–04	"The Immortal Memory"	Ian Mackintosh	5 November 1974
Hero takes on a new deputy weapons and electrical officer, Sub Lieutenant Penn, who has recently graduated with a Navy-sponsored university science degree and has a five year work obligation. However, he has decided while at university as an anti-authoritarian that the military is obsolete and he wants to be a modern leader in business. He comes into conflict with Beaumont, who is a strong believer in all naval traditions. Nialls wants to make an effort to keep Penn in the service, since he represents a new generation of graduates with badly-needed modern skills such as electronics. However, the dispute between Penn and Beaumont is brought to a head at a commemoration of the Battle of Trafalgar, held at sea at the place of battle. Nialls and Beaumont argue, and Nialls reluctantly grants Penn's desire to be recommended for release from service. Guest cast: Struan Rodger as Sub Lieutenant Penn, Mary Tamm as Zimba, John Ringham as F.O. Gibraltar, Jon Croft as CPO Firth, Allan Travell as Quartermaster.
2–05	"One of Those Days"	Ian Mackintosh	12 November 1974
After 3 weeks in port and with a restless crew, Hero is delayed from departure for several hours, leading to events that would otherwise have been avoided. Leading regulator Fuller plays a cat-and-mouse game with Constable Munk, husband of the woman with whom he spent the night. A party of Sea Cadets runs wild on the ship. The head of the frigate squadron, Captain Calder (F), visits for lunch, along with the daughter of a stripper from a nightclub. Preventing unwanted encounters between the guests taxes Last and Beaumont. Guest cast: Peter Cellier as Captain (F), Peter Davidson as Constable Munk, Seretta Wilson as Karen Halbert, John Colclough as Quartermaster, John Bowe as L/Std Jenkins, Eric Kent as Bosun's Mate.
2–06	"The Man From The Sea"	John Wiles	19 November 1974
Hero picks up survivors from a crashed Boeing 707 near St Kilda, Scotland. A doctor is landed on the ship and operates on one of the survivors, who must be taken to Stornoway as quickly as possible. However, another survivor is Lander alias Maritain, a Venezuelan revolutionary who suspects that the plane was bombed by the CIA. Two officials from the FCO are landed on the ship, but one turns out to be American. Nialls initially refuses an order from the MOD to stop the ship and allow Lander to be secretly removed, using the excuse that the patient must be dispatched to hospital. However, when the patient dies, he tests Lander and finds him unworthy of further protection. Guest cast: Aharon Ipalé as Maritain, John Bowe as L/Std Jenkins, Simon Lack as Grey, Ed Bishop as Sanders, Gail Grainger as Heather Gardiner, Peter Cartwright as Sg. Lt. Commander Whittaker, Stephen Hubay as Ramos, Anthony Barnett as Std Selkirk.
2–07	"Nothing To Starboard"	Martin Worth	26 November 1974
When Beaumont is bringing Hero into Portsmouth, Nialls takes control at a critical moment, which for Beaumont continues a pattern where he isn't trusted by Nialls. He seriously considers taking a job he is offered to run a yacht chartering company, also in the hope that it would improve his chances with an ex-girlfriend. Meanwhile, Nialls visits his own girlfriend in Exeter, but she is unhappy with the part-time relationship. Back on the ship, Hero must complete a challenging replenishment at sea manoeuvre. Nialls, although suffering from gastric flu insists on doing it himself, but makes a mess of it and reluctantly hands control to Beaumont. Completing the operation perfectly, his confidence is restored and he tells Nialls that he will refuse the job offer. The two men hope for the best with their respective relationships. Guest cast: Patrick Holt as Paul Danbury, Noel Johnson as Rear-Admiral Beaumont, Mary Hignett as Mrs. Beaumont, Jenny Hanley as Helen Danbury, Isla Blair as Sarah Foulkes, Neil Wilson as barman.
2–08	"Distant Waters"	Norman Ashby	3 December 1974
The crew of a British trawler, fed up with their skipper's erratic performance, confine him to his cabin and take over the boat. A loyal crew member sends a distress signal, and Hero on fishery protection duty investigates. The crew claim that they confined him for his own protection after he became drunk and violent. The skipper initially refuses to leave his cabin to meet a boarding party, using a handgun as a deterrent, but is eventually taken to Hero. A doctor diagnoses carcinoma of the stomach, giving him no more than three months to live, but he was already aware of the disease and was hoping to die at sea. After Nialls convinces him not to press charges for mutiny, he resumes command of the trawler. Guest cast: Bernard Kay as Skipper Briggs, Tom Chadbon as Ron Walker, Thomas Heathcote as Norman King, Ian Liston as Harry Shotton, Christopher Blake as Surgeon Lt. Newcombe, James Walsh as Joe Carter, John Hartley as Stan Beaton.
2–09	"Away Seaboat's Crew"	John Armstrong	10 December 1974
Hero takes on two new sailors at Plymouth, O.S. Jones and L.S. Steele, and departs for an exercise in the Arctic. Steele quickly comes into conflict with AB Radcliffe, who had been a Petty Officer above Steele on a previous ship but has since been demoted. When Steele presses charges against Radcliff for refusing an order, Radcliffe threatens Steele. At night, Steele is alone writing a letter and goes on deck to fix a noisy tarp on a boat, but falls overboard. Nobody notices that he is missing until the next day, when Hero reverses course to search. Radcliff is under suspicion, although he notices the loose tarp and points it out to Nialls. After a day and night searching, with little hope that Steele would still be alive in the cold water, he is nevertheless rescued. Guest cast: Peter Winter as Lieutenant Melville, Lewis Collins as L/Sea Steele, Antony Webb as AB Radcliffe, Robin Davies as Ord. Jones, Joe Dunlop as L/Sea Crimlisk, Ellis Jones as AB Richards.
2–10	"Echo of Battle"	Allan Prior	17 December 1974
Hero is instructed to pick up a German government minister, Lescher, who wishes to observe an exercise involving Hero and a German submarine. Nialls is mystified by the request, but when he discovers that Lescher is ex-navy, unwell, suffering nightmares and possibly suicidal, he requests Lescher's military service records from the MOD. These reveal that Lescher was a top U-boat captain, the sole survivor of his submarine when it was fired on by a British ship when trying to surrender. When the exercise takes place, Hero detects the submarine and fires mortars, and the submarine surfaces, during which time Lescher has become more and more panicked. He is taken to a cabin, and reveals to Nialls that the exercise was a close reenactment of his final submarine battle, and he was hoping it would help with his nightmares and flashbacks. Guest cast: Richard Warner as Lescher, Geoffrey Russell as Williams, John Oxley as Wimmer/Wickert, David G. March as Muller, John Bowe as L Std Jenkins.

=== Series 3 ===
No.	Title	Written by	Original release date
3–01	"And Wings of Gold"	Ian Mackintosh	6 January 1976
Hero receives a new commander Alan Glenn, a Phantom pilot, upsetting Beaumont who once again thinks that his navy career has stalled. They are called to an emergency: a Russian submarine is immobilized near Jan Mayen, an island in the Arctic Ocean, and Captain Herrick joins the ship. An expert on submarines, he is keen to observe the Russian vessel, but he also has a history with Glenn, who he blames for the death of his brother in a Phantom accident. Herrick pushes Glenn to take Hero through a dangerous moving ice field to try to reach the sub before a pair of Russian destroyers. Beaumont points out to Glenn that Herrick is also suffering as a relative underperformer in an illustrious naval family, with his brother the Second Sea Lord, and is looking for a chance for promotion. However, Hero must retreat in the face of terrible sea conditions, barely escaping the ice with only minor damage. Guest cast: William Lucas as Captain Herrick, James Leith as Lieutenant Tagg, Marian Diamond as Surgeon Lt. (D) Sue Herrick, Paul Aston as Midshipman Vidler.
3–02	"What Are Friends For?"	Michael J. Bird	13 January 1976
Hero boards and searches the Appleton Lady, a boat suspected of drug smuggling, but nothing suspicious is found. However, Glenn observed them dumping items overboard and asks to speak to the captain, who is an old friend named Kenyon. Kenyon gives his word that they were not smuggling drugs, but only items such as watches. Glenn says he owes him a favour, and allows him to leave without reporting the dumped items. Some time later, Hero is asked again to find the boat, after it was seen picking up drugs near Scheveningen. Hero finds it once again, and this time uses the Wasp to net a discarded item before it sinks. Glenn again interviews Kenyon, and shows him the recovered heroin. Kenyon claims he needed the money for treatment for his sick child, but Glenn in disbelief has him detained. In court, Kenyon pleads guilty and doesn't mention the child, but Glenn visits Kenyon's wife and finds that the story was true and the child is dead, and that he hadn't mentioned it in court to keep the information from the child. Later, Glenn reveals to a friend that Kenyon had saved his navy career, by taking the blame for a prank gone wrong which both had organized. Guest cast: Matthew Long as David Kenyon, Marian Diamond as Sue Herrick, Claire Nielson as Valerie Kenyon, Roy Boyd as Joe Murphy, John Barcroft as Henderson, Stanley Platts as Crown Court Judge.
3–03	"Knight Errant"	Ben Bassett	20 January 1976
Hero finds a stationary yacht, the Knight Errant, west of the Azores. The lone yachtsman is acting erratically, using a chart from 1938 and having smashed his radio with an axe, and he refuses to give his name or accept any offer of assistance. Glenn is uncertain whether to intervene, and dislikes lone yachtsmen in general, but they are defended by Beaumont who is planning a solo voyage of his own. Glenn insists on the yachtsman joining him on Hero for lunch, and is informed by the MOD that he is a renowned sailor and former British Vice Admiral whose wife recently died. The yachtsman returns to his boat, but after some research, Glenn concludes that he is planning to kill himself at a location from his voyage of 1938, which he had described in a book. Glenn talks with the yachtsman on his boat, who reveals that he considers his whole life to be a fraud, and now that his wife is gone he is planning to disappear quietly without damaging the legend that had inspired so many. Glenn allows him to sail off. Guest cast: Bernard Lee as the Yachtsman, Roger Tallon as Leading Steward Aitken.
3–04	"They Also Serve"	Ian Mackintosh	27 January 1976
Hero is undergoing maintenance, with Peek temporarily replacing Beaumont as second in command, and Glenn staying at the home of the port admiral Brinton. Peek's disdainful attitude towards dockworkers causes the foreman to warn him that there has been simmering industrial trouble and he should take care. Meanwhile, Glenn spends time with Brinton's wife Julia, with whom he had an affair ten years ago while Brinton was away. Julia is bored and interested in restarting the affair, which Glenn declines. Peek infuriates the dockworkers when he orders Fuller to tidy up some work in progress, and Hero is put on a blacklist preventing further work. Glenn is called back, but not before Brinton notices his intimacy with Julia, who admits to the previous affair. Glenn, back on the ship and ultimately responsible, needs Brinton's help to resolve the dispute, but is anxious that Brinton will instead destroy his career, while Peek is also expecting the worst. Ultimately, Brinton helps by sending Hero on a bogus urgent sailing to "save lives", allowing the dockworkers to resume work without losing face. Glenn tells Brinton that he won't take action against Peek, since promising careers should not be destroyed just because of one youthful mistake. Guest cast: Richard Leech as Rear-Admiral Brinton, Suzan Farmer as Julia Brinton, Arthur White as Sam Malcolm, Sidney Kean as Lewis, Bill Treacher as Pat, Michael Stainton as Kendall.
3–05	"Under the Surface"	Gidley Wheeler	3 February 1976
Hero performs poorly in exercises with the submarine HMS Ovid. Beaumont blames Glenn, saying that the team always performed well under Nialls. Glenn invites the commander of Ovid to his cabin, who turns out to be a friend named Tremayne. They reminisce over naval school days, and Glenn is reminded that he gave "Porky" Beaumont his nickname, as a pun on "bore". Meanwhile, the rest of the officers hold a meeting to plan the next day's activities, leaving Peek annoyed with Beaumont for keeping him back from his latest girlfriend. Tremayne advises Glenn that Beaumont is right, and Glenn is a terrible anti-submarine captain, and he needs to learn to listen to his crew, particularly Beaumont who is an expert. Tremayne agrees to hold an extra day of exercises with Hero to help Glenn figure it out, although this annoys Beaumont and Peek whose planning for the next day was now discarded. During the exercise, Glenn has some success, with Tremayne giving him an easy start, and then invites Beaumont to show what he can do. Ovid tries to escape but makes a navigation error and heads for a dangerous bank. Beaumont realises what has happened and manages to prevent an accident. Tremayne is grateful, and Glenn gives the credit to Beaumont and Peek. Guest cast: John Castle as Lieutenant-Commander Tremayne, Roger Tallon as Leading Steward Aitken, Paul Alexander as Lieutenant Ringshaw, Richard Adams as Plotter, Harry Waters as Tasi.
3–06	"Rough Run Home"	Jeremy Burnham	10 February 1976
Hero loses a popular crew member to acute peritonitis before he can be brought to shore, with the Wasp pilot Roy Tagg declining to fly in weather conditions outside the operating envelope. Many of the crew and officers think he should have risked it. Meanwhile, the brother-in-law of the dead man, Graham Firth, is working at the Admiralty Experiment Works on stabilization of Leander-class frigates, and has a maverick theory of using the rudders to do the job of the stabilizers. He believes that this could have prevented his brother's death, by providing a stable platform for Wasp operations. After unauthorized tests on a model in a wave tank are successful, he convinces the head of research to perform a sea trial, and takes a team on board Hero. There is concern that the rudders weren't designed for stabilization and could be damaged. It is revealed that in a previous posting Tagg had been court-martialled for an accident when the Wasp was used outside its operating envelope. Firth asks for filming of the trials from the Wasp, but during the first run, Tagg reports strange vibrations and makes an emergency landing. The maintenance crew cannot find any fault, putting Tagg under further pressure. After tension between Firth and Tagg, Tagg invites Firth to be the cameraman for the next run. The problem with the Wasp reoccurs, and this time causes restriction on cyclic control movement. He makes a difficult emergency landing, with Hero operating on rudder stabilization, giving vindication to both Tagg and Firth. Guest cast: James Leith as Lieutenant Tagg, Marian Diamond as Sue Herrick, Bob Mason as Graham Firth, Kevin Brennan as Edwards, Richard Grant as Clarke, Hugh Dickson as Barron, Edward Brooks as Chief Experimenter, David Kincaid as Haslam.
3–07	"All of One Company"	Gidley Wheeler	17 February 1976
Hero receives a young new sailor Dorrity, who is assigned to a mess deck with the unruly Grogan, along with L/Reg Fuller who is supposed to keep things under control. Taking part in a tedious ten day patrol in the Atlantic, Glenn encourages the organization of sports and games to keep up morale. Fuller teaches Dorrity the game of Uckers, but Dorrity is pranked into thinking that he needs special permission to smoke a pipe and makes an unnecessary application to Heron. In another prank, a call is made in the daily orders for a volunteer to be the splash target coxswain, this being a raft towed behind the ship for aircraft to bomb. To the amazement of all, Dorrity applies for the job, and is given lessons in the mess on riding the device. Dorrity briefly steers the ship, which is so unsteady that Glenn sends a reprimand. An event is held in the mess to present to Dorrity a cake with a figurine of a splash target rider, but Dorrity is nowhere to be found. The ship is searched, and the Wasp scrambled, but ultimately Glenn spots him up the mast. He tells Dorrity that he needs to return to the mess deck, which he reluctantly does, where he is invited by Grogan to take his place in a game of Uckers. Guest cast: Peter Duncan as Seaman Dorrity, Steve Gardner as Able Seaman Grogan, Roger Tallon as L Steward Aitken, George Sweeney as Able Seaman Smith, Duncan Faber as Able Seaman Jackson, Christopher Cregan as Able Seaman Edwards.
3–08	"Quiet Run Ashore"	Michael J. Bird	24 February 1976
When a crew member named Brewer is found dead on the minesweeper HMS Ferrington, a board of inquiry is held on Hero. Meanwhile, a detective is making enquiries about a missing teenage girl, Rita Kersey, who was friendly with Brewer. At the inquiry hearing, it appears that the death was a simple accident, where Brewer had been unsteady, perhaps drunk, and had fallen down a ladderwell, as witnessed by crew members Ellis and Lusher. Brewer had been out drinking in Folkestone with a friend Scobie. However, the next day, Kersey's body washes up on the beach, apparently murdered by suffocation, and her shoes are found on the Ferrington. Scobie eventually admits that Brewer had met her in Folkestone and offered her a trip home, hiding her on board, but had accidentally killed her while trying to keep her quiet. He asked Scobie to help throw the body overboard, but Scobie backed out, and after a struggle Brewer fell down the ladderwell. Ellis and Lusher had disposed of Kersey's body to avoid any trouble for the ship and its captain. The crew members are taken by the civil authorities, and Glenn informs the commander of Ferrington that he has been relieved of command, pointing out that he was responsible for everything that happened on the ship. Guest cast: David Robb as Lieutenant Dean, John Duttine as Able Seaman Scobie, Eric Mason as CPO Lusher, Andy Mulligan as MEA(P) Ellis, Oliver Smith as L/Sea Brewer, Catherine Neilson as Rita Kersey, Leslie Schofield as Petty Officer Mills, Howard Southern as Detective Sergeant Maynard, Ian Kellgren as Lieutenant Kennedy, Warwick Evans as Sub. Lieutenant Weyland, Christopher Ravenscroft as Sg. Lieutenant Ansell, Alan Hockey as Councillor Acott, Brian Honeyball as Cook, Nigel Plaskitt as Steward.
3–09	"The Ides of Mark"	Ian Mackintosh	2 March 1976
Hero is preparing for an inspection, to be conducted by Admiral Staunton and staff officer operations Mark Nialls. Glenn and Nialls became enemies years ago when Glenn dissuaded a woman from marrying Nialls, and Glenn is expecting a difficult "evolutions", where the crew is tested with unconventional problems. While Hero's officers are trying to obtain information, Nialls drops false hints; that the Admiral drinks only "planters rocket", which he discovered in Bermuda; and that he desperately wants the autograph of Lily Bevis, an ageing actress. MAA Harry Burnett, who has replaced Heron, is dispatched with Fuller to obtain the autograph. Meanwhile, Peek and Kiley attempt in vain to find the recipe for planters rocket. Attending a naval reception, Peek obtains a glass of the drink from the barman, who refuses to divulge the recipe. Kiley subsequently gives it to the captain of HMS Zephyr to keep him away from Diana, a girl Glenn is interested in: the captain collapses after drinking it. Glenn is misinformed about Diana by Nialls, and offers her dinner and drives her home, which turns out to be at Northwood, 80 miles away. After suffering mishaps he doesn't return to Hero for several hours, by which time Peek is unconscious after trying to recreate planters rocket. Burnett and Fuller also arrive back late, after Burnett has spent many hours playing games such as Battleships and Snakes and Ladders with Bevis, but having obtained the autograph. However, the next day, a ship is needed to respond to an emergency, and since Zephyr is out of action due to the incapacity of her captain, Hero is sent, cancelling the inspection. Guest cast: Donald Hewlett as Rear-Admiral Staunton, Joan Turner as Lily Bevis, Martin Read as Commander Creegan, Victoria Shellard as Diana, Dave Prowse as The Ape, Harry Landis as barman, Beryl Nesbitt as receptionist.
3–10	"The Buccaneer"	Arnold Yarrow	9 March 1976
Glenn's brother Edward (Eddy), a Buccaneer pilot in the Fleet Air Arm is facing a court-martial after he apparently ignored a direct order and made a low pass over a ship, narrowly avoiding a collision. He asks Glenn to represent him, but refuses to explain why he did it. In court, he pleads not guilty to the charges of dangerous flying and disobeying an order, but his case goes badly after his observer Frank Caban takes the stand and says that the order had been received clearly. During a recess, Glenn asks Eddy about a young woman who was observing in court, and he says it is Anneke, Frank's new wife, but he becomes agitated and seems to be in physical pain. Glenn talks with a doctor who says that it could have been caused by emotional stress from the court, but he wouldn't have suffered stress during routine flying. However, Glenn concludes correctly that Eddy was in love with Anneke, and that the emotional stress of flying with Frank caused him to faint during the flight. He admits to this in court, and is subsequently acquitted but directed to the medical board to resolve the stress issues. Guest cast: Keith Varnier as Lieutenant Glenn, Michael Culver as Commander Cleveland, Christopher Strauli as Lieutenant Cavan, Lea Dregorn as Anna Cavan, Michael Sheard as Read-Admiral Chandy, John Line as Captain Redwell, Hugh Ross as Surgeon-Lieutenant Gladman, Robert East as Lieutenant-Commander Huffam, Arnold Peters as President of the Court, Richard Simpson as Judge Advocate, Nigel Crewe as Officer of the Court.
3–11	"Divert With Dispatch"	Derek Ingrey	16 March 1976
The Royal Navy is searching for millionaire Andrew Denecot's yacht, which was last seen leaving Gibraltar with Denecot and his family. A possible sighting is reported by an RAF Nimrod near the Canary Islands, and Hero is sent to investigate. Beaumont remembers its captain, Tony Loader, as a "colourful character". On the yacht, Loader has hijacked the yacht with a crew of criminals and a young woman. Hero sails close to the yacht, confirming its identity, although it has a false name and flag, and is ordered to board it. However, Loader tells Glenn to withdraw, or the Denecot family will be killed. Glenn asks for proof that they are still alive, and is permitted to visit the yacht using the Wasp, and confirms that the woman is Denecot's daughter. Glenn returns to Hero and agrees to withdraw to 20 miles distance. Loader plans to abandon the yacht using small boats to reach the African coast. However, Hero is ordered to board it by force. Glenn deploys two Geminis, commanded by Beaumont and Peek, which drop a rope in front of the yacht to foul its screws, forcing it to stop. They then board it, capturing the crew without casualties. The full story is then revealed: the Denecots were in financial trouble, and intended to fake their deaths in a yacht sinking, while absconding with a box of cash. However, Loader decided to take the cash for himself, and the daughter, in love with Loader, had joined the plan, not realising that her parents would be killed. Guest cast: Philip Bond as Tony Loader, Elizabeth Cassidy as Bobbie, James Leith as Lieutenant Tagg, Mark Eden as Wing-Commander Blazey, Neville Jason as Commander Rockford, Michael Halsey as Belton, Keith Bell as Petrie.
3–12	"Heart of Oak"	Ian Mackintosh	23 March 1976
Fuller's wife Norma unexpectedly arrives in Portsmouth from Glasgow, threatening a divorce unless he leaves the navy. Meanwhile on Hero, Lt Monty Wakelin wants Chief (CPO) Cook Mantell reverted to petty officer, on account of poor work and excessive drinking. Beaumont agrees, but Glenn wants them to spend more time trying to improve him. When Norma insists that Fuller stay with her in a hotel instead of returning to Hero, Glenn goes ashore to try to convince her to find a compromise. She agrees to let Fuller return to Hero, as long as he is back by 4:30. Mantell, drinking heavily in anticipation of his forthcoming meeting with Glenn and presumed demotion, goes to a galley and starts a fryer, then passes out. A fire breaks out, and Fuller, leaving to meet Norma, hears the alarm and sees smoke. He returns and helps Peek drag Mantell out of the galley; they ask Mantell if anybody else is inside, and he responds "petty officer". Fuller goes back in to search, but Mantell is just talking about his new rank. Fuller is caught in an explosion. Glenn phones Norma at the hotel, but she has already left for home. Guest cast: Jeannie McArthur as Norma Fuller, John Rhys-Davies as CPO Cook Mantell, Rio Fanning as CPO Cranfield, Bernard Martin as Policeman.
3–13	"First Turn of the Screw"	Ian Mackintosh	30 March 1976
Hero brings supplies to a scientific station at the usually uninhabited island of North Krona in the Outer Hebrides (North Krona is an apparently fictional island located near Barra Head, named similarly to North Rona.) The station is officially meteorological, but Glenn informs his officers that it is actually monitoring Soviet nuclear submarines. When Glenn and Peek lead two boats ashore, they are given an unexpectedly frosty reception by the head of the station, Anvey, who wants the supplies left on the beach and for Hero to depart as soon as possible. Glenn knows one of the two women on the station, Katharina, but she avoids contact with him, as do the other man and woman. The 5th member of the station, Lovett, is not present. Glenn directs some low-key investigations, and discovers that Anvey doesn't appear to have the right age or description, and that the station staff appear to be covering up for the missing man. Katharina visits Hero and talks with Glenn about their former relationship, which Glenn had ended but is willing to resume, but she doesn't say what's happening at the station. Glenn notices something odd about Anvey's qualifications, and returns to the station with an armed party. They detain the station members and enter the research hut, where as Glenn had inferred, they are not monitoring submarines for the MOD, but conducting dangerous biological weapons research for an intelligence service. Anvey admits that he is actually Lovett, and Anvey had died a few weeks ago in an accident. Instead of reporting it and having the station shut down, they had stored the body in a freezer to continue research which was close to a major breakthrough. Katharina and Glenn speak again, but it appears that neither is willing to put a relationship ahead of their career. Glenn leaves the station staff on the island pending his report. Guest cast: Frederick Jaeger as Anvey/Lovett, Caroline Mortimer as Katharina, Steve Gardner as AB Grogan, Nicholas McArdle as Baker, Shirley Cain as Edith.

=== Series 4 (1977) ===
No.	Title	Written by	Original release date
4–01	"Wind Song"	Ian Mackintosh	4 January 1977
Hero is in Hong Kong and takes on a new first lieutenant, James Napier. Meanwhile, Zoe Carter, a freelance journalist, arrives at the ship and meets the captain Edward Holt, a former submarine commander who has replaced Glenn. She goes on board to interview Thomas Meryon, a British member of parliament, and an opponent of the military, who is staying on Hero to observe its activities first-hand. They discuss Christopher Panmuir, who is at Hong Kong with his sailboat Windsong, and intends to sail to the site of a forthcoming French atmospheric nuclear test as a protest. Carter brings Panmuir to meet Meryon, and Meryon is persuaded to hold a press conference on board Hero to denounce the test. Carter and Holt go out to dinner and discuss Meryon and Holt's ex-wife. At the press conference, Meryon denounces the test, and Carter asks if he will sail in Windsong: put on a spot, he agrees as long as Carter comes along to report it. Holt tries to stop her going, without success. Panmuir, Meryon and Carter sail on Windsong, and Hero follows to keep an eye on things. They reach the test area, but are ignored by the French. They sail into the restricted area, demanding that the test be cancelled. Holt activates anti-nuclear measures on Hero and waits outside the zone. Once the test takes place, Windsong requests rescue, and Hero responds, sailing through fallout. Carter is collected, but Panmuir and Meryon decide to sail further. Panmuir hopes to make a larger statement with his death, while Meryon is tired of being considered a phoney. Guest cast: Clifford Rose as Meryon, David Bailie as Panmuir.
4–02	"Singapore Incident"	Ian Mackintosh	11 January 1977
At HMS Tamar in Hong Kong, Holt is introduced to Francis Corbin of the Foreign Office. Holt is told that an aircraft en route to Singapore has ditched near Vietnam, and Hero must sail urgently to recover a briefcase of extremely delicate papers. Holt protests that it would be very hard to find the wreck, and they should be looking for survivors, but he is instructed to find the papers and take them to the High Commissioner in Singapore. On Hero, Fuller is writing to his wife, who has just given birth to their first child. Hero sails to the reported crash location, and to their amazement the wreck is found immediately. Hans Anderson and Napier dive to the aircraft, easily recovering the briefcase, but find no bodies aboard. However, when a Russian "Bear" aircraft flies over, and a BBC broadcast describes the crash and Hero's role, the nature of the "secret" mission is questioned, and there is concern that the Singapore operation may be hazardous. Napier is tasked with the job, and decides to take Fuller on the grounds that he has been proven with his fire rescue, for which he received the George Medal (Napier also has a George Medal for a bomb disposal job). Napier and Fuller leave Hero, unarmed, and collect a rental car. They are immediately attacked, but manage to escape, and a car chase ensues. They leave the car at a rural village, from which they eventually make their way back to Hero, after being shot at. Corbin unexpectedly arrives on Hero, having flown from Hong Kong. Holt accuses him of setting up the operation to fail, and is angry that his crew members have been put at risk. Corbin says they did well, but is shocked when Holt tells him that the papers were safely returned to Hero. Holt asks him to apologize, which he does very reluctantly. Holt then admits that he had ordered Napier to dump the papers in case of trouble, and thanks to his concern for Fuller's child, he had obeyed. Guest cast: Peter Miles as Corbin, John Stone as Captain-in-Charge, David Howe as AB Wright, Ian McNeice as AB Clark.
4–03	"Diplomatic Package"	Ian Mackintosh	18 January 1977
Hero visits the (apparently fictional) island state of Locloon (sp?) on a visit intended to help the UK's chances of handling the exploitation of a newly discovered oil field. The officers (and Zoe Carter, looking for a story) attend a reception hosted by the influential but strict Zee Khay Lim, where Peek meets and quickly falls in love with Zee's daughter Akiko. Things are not going well for British interests, with the unenthusiastic Consul Cobbold expecting the deal to go to the Americans, and Zee saying he's impressed only by honourable behaviour. There is tension between Holt and Napier when Holt thinks Napier is becoming romantically involved with Carter, and Carter becomes angry at Holt when she discovers his attitude. Peek wants to marry Akiko, and Akiko asks him to smuggle her on board Hero, since she has no way of escaping her father's influence and an unwanted arranged marriage. Peek discusses her with Holt, but Holt says they cannot ignore local customs and cause a diplomatic incident. Peek asks Midshipman Vidler to tell Akiko that he was unable to meet with her as planned. Holt sends a gift to Carter as reconciliation. Hero leaves port, but Akiko is discovered in a spare cabin, having been brought aboard by Vidler after Akiko told him about her situation. Holt orders Hero back to Locloon, where she is returned to her father. Her father reveals that she had been lying all along: that she is younger than she had claimed, 16, has no marriage arranged, and was trying to reach an ensign from an American ship which had visited recently. Zee is grateful for her return and agrees to help the UK reach a deal on the oil. Guest cast: Fiesta Mei-Ling as Akiko, Burt Kwouk as Zee Khay Lim, Paul Aston as Midshipman Vidler, Gerald Sim as Cobbold, Anthony Chinn as Chang.
4–04	"Rendezvous"	Roger Parkes	25 January 1977
Hong Kong businessman Victor Chelten escapes from a mental hospital and goes on the run, shooting two men in the process. Hero is assigned to help the police, led by Chief Inspector Grainger, as they search the outlying islands. Kiley knows Victor and his wife Jenny, who he is in love with, although he hasn't seen her since she married Victor 10 years ago. He arranges to meet her, and she tells him that she thinks the police intend to kill Victor, but he'll be hiding on Han Hing Island. Holt exchanges information with Zoe, who says Victor has been known for women, alcohol, and drugs, until having a complete breakdown, while there has also been gossip about Jenny having an affair, which Kiley refutes indignantly. Kiley reveals Victor's location to Holt, on the condition that they land without a police squad and that Kiley can try to talk to him. Meanwhile, Zoe is interviewing Jenny, and reveals that Victor was divorcing her due to her affair with a penniless young army officer, and she would stand to gain financially if Victor died before the divorce. Victor confronts Kiley on the island, telling him he has been fed up with his wife telling him for 10 years that she should have married Kiley instead, and when Grainger arrives, threatens to shoot them both. However, Napier and Fuller arrive, and Fuller shoots Victor dead with his rifle. Kiley arranges to meet Jenny, but just watches her from a distance. Guest cast: Joanna Dunham as Jenny Chelten, Ronald Lewis as Victor Chelten, Max Faulkner as Chief Inspector Grainger.
4–05	"Girl From The Sea"	Michael J. Bird	1 February 1977
Hero and Army Air Corps helicopters rescue a young and apparently wealthy Chinese woman, alone in the ocean. She apparently doesn't speak English, and Hero takes her to Hong Kong. She is taken away by a police inspector, who later says that she is Lily Tan, a singer at a Wan Chai nightclub. She had claimed that she had fallen into the sea at the waterfront, which Peek says was inconsistent with where she was found. Holt, Napier, and Carter attend the opening of a youth centre, on request of the Governor at short notice. The centre was a gift from Henry Witzel, a wealthy and reclusive American living in Hong Kong, who invites them back to his mansion for a reception. There, he praises Carter's work and offers to be interviewed the following day, which is unprecedented. That night, Holt and Carter visit the nightclub and watch Tan perform, and overhear her accepting a gift from somebody unseen. They note that she can speak English perfectly well. Carter arrives at Witzel's home for the interview, and observes Tan storm out, apparently after an argument, while Witzel is alone inside. Back with Holt, she speculates that Tan was Witzel's mistress, and that apparently something sinister was going on and Witzel was keeping tabs on what they all knew. Holt discovers that Witzel owns a yacht, which was at sea on the day they recovered Tan, while Carter follows Tan and discovers that she lives in a luxury apartment on Repulse Bay Road, owned by Witzel's company. They speculate that Witzel had attempted to murder her, by dumping her at sea, and that she was now attempting to blackmail him. Concerned about her safety, Holt decides to confront Witzel at his home. After telling Witzel his theory, Witzel and his wife reveal the truth, that Tan was their adopted daughter, and had gone sailing alone in a hired dinghy after Witzel had refused to lend her his yacht, and had suffered an accident at sea. They had only been arguing about her new boyfriend, who was in the shipping business; he turns out to be MAA Harry Burnett. Guest Cast: Wei Wei Wong as Lily Tan, Morris Perry as Henry Witzel, Anthony Gardner as Lieutenant-Commander Lane, Prentis Hancock as Inspector Fielding, Maggie Riley as Louise Witzel, Norman Atkyns as government official, The Chris Allen Sound as Lily Tan's Group, Vincent Wong as M.C.
4–06	"A Matter of History"	Michael J. Bird	8 February 1977
Hero is sent to a fictional British Overseas Territory – Eddowes Island – at the time of its handover to an unnamed Latin American country. Eddowes is 50 miles offshore, and the islanders are being offered a choice between retaining British nationality and leaving, or staying and becoming citizens of the unnamed country. 99% of the islanders are against the handover, and a group led by Ralph Perrin is conducting a last-ditch sabotage campaign. Hero is ordered to provide "aid to the civil power", with sailors backing up the police and guarding infrastructure. Napier is sympathetic to the islanders and is spending time with Perrin's daughter Barbara. Perrin's gang steal a field gun, with which they plan to fire on the Latin American naval ship, in the hope of bringing Hero into a conflict and stopping the handover. Napier discovers the plan from Barbara and is able to talk Perrin into giving up. The episode had very strong parallels with the contemporary Falkland Islands situation, and it foreshadowed the events that led to the Falklands War. Much of the episode was filmed on Dartmoor, states the Michael J. Bird website (link below). During filming of this episode, series creator Ian Mackintosh received news that he had been awarded an MBE for his work on Warship. Guest cast: Rosalind Ayres as Barbara Perrin, Brian Croucher as Ralph Perrin, Jack Watson as Walter Perrin, Derrick Slater as Lillie, Melville Jones as Dawlish, John Rolfe as local police Superintendent Lodge, Ronald Leigh-Hunt as British Governor Gage, and Peter Williams as British Foreign Office official Strudwick.
4–07	"Counter Charge"	Gidley Wheeler	17 February 1977
Hero has been away from Britain for 207 days. On the day before her arrival at Pompey, performance reviews are in progress. Holt is recommending Napier for promotion but tells him he needs to listen more often to advice from others. Napier is commending Petty Officer Asdale for his charitable work. That night, when the canteen is supposed to be locked, containing the proceeds from days of roaring trade, Fuller is passing and discovers Asdale inside holding the money. He phones MAA Burnett to report the break-in. However, Asdale states that it was he who found Fuller inside, and Fuller had grabbed the phone first. Napier and Monty conduct an investigation, with Napier acting in his typically bombastic way and ignoring any advice from Monty. After reviewing various evidence, including Napier's missing gold lighter found in the canteen, but which was a model also owned by Fuller, and the financial positions of the two crew members (Asdale being well-off, and Fuller struggling), Napier is inclined to blame Fuller. However, Holt in the meantime has perused the service records of the two crew members. He discovers that Asdale was passed over for promotion in a previous posting on the advice of Napier, who had forgotten about it entirely. Napier's finances are not much better than Fuller's. Holt concludes that Asdale had intended to frame Napier by leaving the cash in his cabin. Holt has a chat with Asdale, showing him that Napier had recommended him for a British Empire Medal, and persuades him to make a truthful statement. Guest cast: David Daker as PO Asdale, Patrick Durkin as Mr Parsons, Anthony Allen as Pomem Harris.
4–08	"Man in Reserve"	Gidley Wheeler	22 February 1977
During exercises with the Royal Naval Reserve, pilot Tim Proctor flies the Wasp over HMS Rellington (displaying pennant number M1136, per HMS Fittleton, a minesweeper sunk in a collision in 1976). While Proctor complains about the RNR ship being miles out of position, Rellington complains about the unscheduled appearance of the Wasp. Proctor had flown the wrong course, which isn't helping his chances of staying in the Navy. On request of officers on Rellington, a crew exchange with Hero takes place: a Lieutenant Mannering, and Dolyle, a doctor, are exchanged with Proctor and his crewmate. Proctor gets along well enough on Rellington; the officers are happy to have a break from Mannering. On Hero, Mannering is constantly mentioning his various supposed achievements, not limited to writing a book and translating the French edition himself, being fluent in most European languages, being a surfer and a diver, assisting his father on his oil rigs, teaching himself computer programming in three hours, service in Vietnam in '68 and he also wins at cards on Hero. On Rellington, Proctor suffers a serious accident and must have an operation within an hour, but the doctor is on Hero, which is two hours distant. Using the Wasp apparently isn't an option, since the pilot is the casualty. However, Mannering casually claims that he could fly the Wasp, but of course isn't permitted. Holt decides to let him try, and delays requesting authorisation from Command. Napier, extremely dubious, nevertheless volunteers to go along and operate the winch. Mannering is able to fly out to Rellington, but has difficulty establishing the right position to hover; Napier is able to help him verbally, and they successfully return Proctor to Hero. The patient dies despite all efforts. Holt receives a reply from Command, that the unqualified officer on no account to be permitted to pilot the Wasp. Guest cast: Michael Culver as Lieutenant Mannering, RNR, Richard Cornish as Lieutenant Proctor, Trader Faulkner as Commander Handley, RNR, Jon Croft as Lieutenant Spender, RNR, Michael Lees as Sg. Lt-Commander Doyle, RNR, Richard Borthwick as L/Seaman Gray, Stephen Bent as L/Aircrewman Burridge.
4–09	"Fall From Grace"	Ian Mackintosh	1 March 1977
Hero arrives at Portland after a bad exercise in a gale. Captain Calder (F) sends a sarcastic message about the state of their boats. Holt suggests that a ship is defined by its men, not its appearance. They bet a case of Richebourg '64 wine over a whaleboat race. Although Calder's ship Janus supposedly has the best whaler crew in the fleet, Hero's boat wins easily, thanks to Hero's divers sabotaging Janus's boat. Calder and his First Lieutenant, Ledson, declare war. A party from Janus sneaks aboard Hero and releases the anchor, giving the divers a lengthy job in retrieving it. An electrician is bitten by a rat, which when caught is wearing a ribbon with a message from Janus. In retaliation, Hero dispatches Zoe Carter to "interview" Calder; she writes an article in which everything he says is twisted and taken out of context. Anderson, spying, discovers that Ledson is planning to use a fake NAAFI area manager, who will go aboard Hero and set off a thunderflash. Unfortunately, Calder isn't impressed with the plan, and changes it. When a NAAFI area manager coincidentally turns up at Hero the next day, he is arrested by Napier at gunpoint, but proves to be genuine. Meanwhile, a fake dockworker boards Hero, and runs up a gin pennant, obliging Hero to offer free drinks to all officers in port. Hero gets the last prank, when Ledson is invited over on a pretext; Peek dresses up as a Leading Steward, and acts insubordinately in the wardroom; Ledson returns to Calder to report the discipline problem, but when Calder takes it up with Holt, Holt simply states that his navigator Peek has every right to use the wardroom. The officers on Hero are celebrating, when Calder unexpectedly arrives. He had shouted at Ledson, and now his wife Arabella was coming over to complain, and he decided to make a common stand with Holt. She has a fearsome reputation as the daughter of the Sea Lord. She informs them that she was going to tell "daddy" about their silly games, but instead, she'll see that they are added to the top of his list of dignitaries to be invited to boring garden parties and so forth. Holt offers Calder a glass of Richebourg '64, and Calder tells Holt to clean up his boats before he leaves port. Guest cast: Peter Cellier as Captain Calder, David Rintoul as Lieutenant-Commander Ledson, Judith Paris as Arabella Ledson, Andrew Bradford as Lieutenant Scarf, Robert Gillespie as NAAFI Manager, Chris Bell as Dockyard Worker.
4–10	"Jack Fell Down"	Gidley Wheeler	8 March 1977
Sub-Lieutenant Carwith joins Hero. Previously an instructor at Dartmouth training squadron, he has graduated from the Greenwich Naval College as a new officer. On his way on board, he reprimands a sailor, AB Gifford. Gifford is later in a pub with his mother, who is hoping he can make it up the ranks. Gifford tells her about the new officer from the lower decks. Carwith is assigned to a department, and is also given officer of the day duties. Carwith meets Gifford, who has a poor reputation on the ship, and offers him a fresh start and help with trying for Leading Seaman. Carwith has mixed experiences, on one occasion helping Hero receive a rare compliment about her appearance from the Admiral, but also making an occasional mistake, and he doesn't socialise or smoke or drink. Carwith continues to help Gifford, including signing a change of duty request which should have been handled by a Petty Officer. Gifford boasts on the mess deck that Carwith is easy to handle, although Leading Seaman Lovell tries to keep him in line. The Petty Officer complains to Chief Petty Officer Straker, who takes it up with Carwith, and subsequently with Napier. Napier tries to explain to Carwith where he is going wrong, but they end up arguing about Gifford. Carwith leaves for rounds; he finds the lower ratings slacking and orders unpopular measures. He then makes a mistake in protocol, which the Admiral complains about. Peek takes the blame for the mistake, further alienating Carwith. He decides that he has had enough and leaves the ship to get drunk at the pub; Lovell can't convince him to return. Holt sends out search parties after it turns out that he had taken his personal effects and jumped ship. Carwith, at the airport, about to board a plane, coincidentally meets Gifford's mother, who talks about how proud everybody must be of him. He decides not to board, and Napier and Lovell, having guessed where he was going, return him to Hero just in time for sailing. He stands on the deck in uniform, and Napier tells Holt that he will be alright now. Guest cast: Maurice Roëves as Sub-Lieutenant Carwith, Ian Liston as Leading Seaman Lovell, James Lister as Able Seaman Gifford, Bernard Hill as Chief Petty Officer Straker, Pamela Sholto as Mabel Gifford, Alex Kirsta as Airport Receptionist, John Bowler as Able Seaman Robbins, Chas Bryer as Able Seaman Tull.
4–11	"Robertson Crusoe"	John Wiles	15 March 1977
Hero, while monitoring a Soviet weapon testing ship, recovers an unknown device from the sea, presumed to be a new type of mine. Napier keeps a close eye on it while Hero returns it to port, concerned that it may be booby-trapped to explode on a timer. Incidentally, they also spotted a man on the supposedly uninhabited island Errol(sp). The MoD is interested in the device, but the Home Office is more interested in Errol, since although it was never formally annexed by the UK, they don't want to see it claimed by another state. Hero is ordered to return and remove the man. When they find him, he says he's a Scot named Robertson from Fort William and wishes to be left alone. Some details from his story can be confirmed, and the Home Office is happy to have a British presence on the island. Peek notices that Robertson has a photograph of an attractive woman who seemed familiar. After Hero has left, he finds the same photograph in a magazine, named as Amanda Clark Davis, whose father, Rolland Clark Davis, died recently but the body was never recovered. Holt guesses that Robertson is actually Davis, and returns to Errol in time to catch him leaving the island with Amanda. He had faked his death to collect an insurance payout. Napier, still monitoring the "mine", hears it ticking, and decides to defuse the device. It turns out to be a decoy left by the Soviets to encourage Hero to depart. Guest cast: Patrick Troughton as Robertson, Ivor Roberts as Lister, James Greene as Vice Chief of Naval Staff, Christopher Williams as Lieutenant Barr, Sarah Douglas as Amanda, Richard McNeff as Admiral's secretary.
4–12	"Someone, Somewhere"	Ian Mackintosh	22 March 1977
Holt receives a letter from Naval Security, while AB Blane receives a letter from an anonymous informant. Holt's letter demands the termination of his relationship with Zoe Carter, since she has been found to be an active member of anarchist and revolutionary groups. Holt is told not to talk with Zoe about the allegations, and risks losing his high-level security clearance, which would end his naval career. Blane's letter claims that his young wife, Samantha, is having an affair. Samantha is struggling with long separations from her husband. A visit is arranged from a welfare officer, Chief Wren Callins, who finds nothing amiss. Blane decides not to take early leave. Napier and Holt discuss Holt's lack of prospects outside the Navy. Commander Hirsch informs him that the matter is being passed to MI5, and he'll have only 48 hours to decide. Holt says they are not sleeping together, but he hopes to marry her when the moment is right, and he had never suspected radical politics. Blane receives a second anonymous letter, naming Vince Weston as the culprit. Callins is asked to make a second visit. While she is there, Weston lets himself in through the back door. Blane, when he is informed, is angry, and takes early leave. He arrives at his house to catch Samantha with Weston on the couch. She says it has never gone any further, but Blane returns to Hero, saying he is going to put his career first. Holt meets Zoe several times, but she doesn't give anything away. Holt thinks she is hiding it from him. Holt asks Zoe directly if she would consider marrying him. She suggests that it's possible. Holt is up all night in his cabin pondering, eventually he writes a letter of resignation from the Navy. Samantha leaves her home to come to Portsmouth, having decided to turn over a new leaf, and Blane decides to give her the benefit of the doubt. Hirsch unexpectedly offers Holt apologies and regrets: MI5 wants no action taken. Zoe had been approached by radical groups for help publicising their cause, but she was unsympathetic and had approached MI5. Since they often used journalists, they had asked her to string them along, while keeping it secret from Holt. Guest cast: Sebastian Abineri as Able Seaman Blane; John Ringham as Commander Hirsch; Patricia Garwood as Chief Wren Callins; Jane Hayden as Samantha Blane; Charles Baillie as Vince Weston.
4–13	"Operation Sting-Ray"	Ian Macintosh	29 March 1977
When a coup takes place in Dubarra, Hero is sent along with other ships on an evacuation mission. The new government has decided to expel the British, and nationalize British companies, but has inexplicitly closed the borders. With their lives in danger from rampaging mobs, the nationals are moved to the British consulate. Zoe Carter, reporting on the coup, refuses to go. She is saved from death by an old friend named Driss, a former terrorist/commando leader who she had known in Beirut. She suspects he knows what is going on with the coup, but he denies it. The British launch their operation, with Buccaneers from HMS Ark Royal attacking defences at the airport so that marines can be brought in by navy helicopters and LCVPs to secure it. A squad from Hero secures a wharf, allowing Hero to berth. A second squad led by Napier takes the civilians from the consulate to the airport. Meanwhile, Driss is unhappy with this turn of events, and having learnt of Zoe's relationship with Holt, takes her hostage, demanding that Holt return the civilians to the consulate in return for her life. Holt refuses, and the civilians are collected by Hercules aircraft, while the marines continue to hold off the Dubarran army. Driss finally tells Zoe what was going on: he had assisted the rebels with the coup, and in exchange they had closed the borders so that he could take hostages. He had intended to exchange them for two brothers of his deceased wife, who were in prison in Vienna, to meet a promise he had made to her, and had been willing to kill hostages until his demands were met. Zoe reminds him he used to protect women and children, but he says the death of his wife had changed him. Holt arrives, and after a short stand-off, shoots Driss dead. Guest cast: Damien Thomas as Driss, Frank Mills as F.O.C.A.S., John Quentin as F.O.O., Anton Darby as Lawson, Michael Bangerter as Captain Bradman RM, Roger Neil as Amphibious Officer.

== See also ==
- Patrol Boat
- Making Waves (2004 ITV series based upon Warship)
- Warship (2010 Channel 5 documentary series with same name as Warship)
