= Rex Robinson =

Rex Robinson may refer to:

- Rex Robinson (American football)
- Rex Robinson (actor)
