= King of the River =

British TV drama series (1966–1967)

- Genre: Drama
- Created by: Colin Morris
- Starring: Bernard Lee; Meg Wynn Owen; Geraldine Sherman; Robert Brown
- Country of origin: United Kingdom
- Original language: English
- No. of series: 1
- No. of episodes: 17 (all missing)

Production
- Producer: Colin Morris
- Running time: 50 minutes

Original release
- Network: BBC1
- Release: 6 July 1966 – 19 February 1967

King of the River is a British seventeen-part television series transmitted by the BBC between 1966 and 1967.

The series centred on the King family and their efforts to maintain their sail-driven barge transport business. It starred Bernard Lee, otherwise known as M in the James Bond films. No episodes are known to exist. Locations used for filming included the Old Neptune pub in Whitstable, Kent and Sheerness High Street, Kent.

== Episodes ==
| Date | Title | Author | Director | Cast | Ref. |
|---|---|---|---|---|---|
| 6 July 1966 | Foreign Invasion | Colin Morris | Eric Hills | starring Bernard Lee with Robert Brown, Sandra Dorne, Richard James, Meg Wynn Owen, Geraldine Sherman Cast in order of appearance: Russian Captain: Richard Marner; Leonov: David Spenser; Ruth King: Meg Wynn Owen; Saul King: Richard James; Joss King: Bernard Lee; Ben King: Robert Brown; Susanna King: Geraldine Sherman; Bob Elliot: Frazer Hines; Jack Elliot: Glynn Edwards; Red Elliot: Patrick Scanlan; The Rev Ackroyd: George A. Cooper; George Elliot: Peter Madden; Nel: Sandra Dorne; Judy: Ann Way; Tom: Bart Allison; Peter Salt: Michael Wynne; Charlie: Wally Patch; Henry: Kenneth Keeling; PC: Douglas Blackwell; Visitor: Matthew Roberton; Radio Operator: Denis Cleary | |
| 12 July 1966 | Sunset for a Sailorman | Colin Morris | Brian Parker | starring Bernard Lee with Richard James, Meg Wynn Owen, Geraldine Sherman Cast in order of appearance: Joss King: Bernard Lee; Saul King: Richard James; Betty: Katherine Schofield; Gelder: John Graham; Brigham: Charles Carson; Ruth King: Meg Wynn Owen; Susanna King: Geraldine Sherman; Docker: Joe Gibbons; Young docker: Anthony Colby; Ganger: Leslie Dwyer; Jim: George Tovey; Detective: Iain Anders; Cedric: Paul Williamson; Clem: Will Stampe; Tom: Brian Cant; Susanna's boyfriend: Peter Blair-Stewart; Stonehouse: Robert Dean | |
| 19 July 1966 | Shipwreck | Colin Morris | Gerard Glaister | starring Bernard Lee with Robert Brown, Richard James, Meg Wynn Owen, Geraldine Sherman Cast in order of appearance: Susanna King: Geraldine Sherman; Radio operator: Eric McCaine; Joss King: Bernard Lee; Henry: Kenneth Keeling; Ben King: Robert Brown; George Elliot: Peter Madden; Bob Elliot: Frazer Hines; The Rev Ackroyd: George A Cooper; Tom: Bart Allison; Joe: Stacy Davies; Peter Salt: Michael Wynne; Saul King: Richard James; Ruth King: Meg Wynn Owen; Italian captain: Jeffrey Segal; Italian sailor: Gino Melvazzi; Italian radio operator: Tony Goodson; Italian girl: Toni Kanal | |
| 27 July 1966 | What Shall We Do with a Drunken Sailor? | Elaine Morgan | Peter Cregeen | starring Bernard Lee with Robert Brown, Sandra Dorne, Richard James, Meg Wynn Owen, Geraldine Sherman Cast in order of appearance: Saul King: Richard James; Small boy: Freddie Foot; Ruth King: Meg Wynn Owen; Joss King: Bernard Lee; Susanna King: Geraldine Sherman; Roger: David Beale; Nel: Sandra Dorne; Etienne: Carlos Pierre; Pierre: Guido Adorni; French sailors: Louis Raynes; French sailors: Tony Maddison; French sailors: Harry Tierney; French sailors: Ernest Jennings; French sailors: Ian Gray; Regulars in pub: Edward Kelsey; Regulars in pub: Fred Hugh; Regulars in pub: Sidney Gatcum; Old cockney: Harold Bennett; Ben: Robert Brown; Blonde: Bridget Terry | |
| 3 August 1966 | It's an Ill Wind | Donald Bull | Gerard Glaister | starring Bernard Lee with Meg Wynn Owen, Geraldine Sherman and guest star, Esmond Knight Cast in order of appearance: Joss King: Bernard Lee; Ruth King: Meg Wynn Owen; Susanna King: Geraldine Sherman; Mather: Paul Dawkins; Derek: Clive Blackwell; Willy: Martin Kendle; Molly stoker: Eve Pearce; Donner: Esmond Knight; Dan: Denis Cleary; Capt Van Der Donk: Peter Hager; Waterguard: Fred Ferris | |
| 10 August 1966 | By Guess and by God | Anthony Coburn | Peter Sasdy | starring Bernard Lee with Sandra Dorne, Meg Wynn Owen, Gregory Phillips, Geraldine Sherman and guest star, Leslie Sands Cast in order of appearance: Joss King: Bernard Lee; Captain Abel Gasser: Leslie Sands; Nel: Sandra Dorne; Nat: Reg Lye; Ruth King: Meg Wynn Owen; Susanna King: Geraldine Sherman; Saul King: Gregory Phillips; Bristow: Edwin Brown; Plater: Kenneth Watson; Gelder: John Graham; Skinner: Donald Pickering; Secretary: Jane Walker; Jock Craig: Barry Wilsher; Van driver: Michael Earl | |
| 17 August 1966 | Down River to Glory | Donald Bull | Peter Cregeen | Cast in order of appearance: Joss King: Bernard Lee; Susanna King: Geraldine Sherman; Ruth King: Meg Wynn Owen; Saul King: Gregory Phillips; Secretary: Jane Walker; Gelder: John Graham; Angela Brigham: Elisabeth Murray; Barmaid: Mary Chirgwin; Butters: John Tats; Rowlands: Kenneth J. Warren; Alice King: Mona Bruce; Prosser: Donald Pelmear; Nel: Sandra Dorne; Red Elliot: Patrick Scanlan; Ben King: Robert Brown; Charlie: Theo Agar; Wentworth: Michael Bird; Baldy: Jimmy Gardner; Duty Officer: Stan Jay | |
| 24 August 1966 | Once Aboard the Lugger | Elaine Morgan | Eric Prlce | starring Bernard Lee with Sandra Dorne, Meg Wynn Owen, Gregory Phillips, Geraldine Sherman Cast in order of appearance: Cedric: Paul Williamson; Joss King: Bernard Lee; Nel: Sandra Dorne; Susanna King: Geraldine Sherman; Charlie: Wally Patch; Sam: Artro Morris; Joe: Fred Hugh; Tim: Sean Arnold; Ruth King: Meg Wynn Owen; Saul King: Gregory Phillips; Annie: Veronica Purnell | |
| 31 August 1966 | Sling Your Hook | Alistair Bell | Eric Hills | starring Bernard Lee with Robert Brown, Sandra Dorne, Meg Wynn Owen, Gregory Phillips, Geraldine Sherman Cast in order of appearance: Captain Dan Farley: Erik Chitty; Councillor Riches: Donald Morley; Sarah Shelley: Diana King; Joss King: Bernard Lee; Saul King: Gregory Phillips; Ruth King: Meg Wynn Owen; Joe Giles: Malcolm Patten; Susanna King: Geraldine Sherman; Ben King: Robert Brown; Nel: Sandra Dorne; Ralph Quenell: Walter Horsbrugh; Julian Pratt: Paul Bacon; Councillor Bigelow: Julian Somers; Councillor Todman: Malcolm Watson; Charlie: Wally Patch; MacArthur: Don McKillop; Sam Giles: Tom Bowman; Reporter: Simon Taylor; Barton: Van Boolen; Harriet: Katherine Parr; Chauffeur: Anthony Sheppard | |
| 7 September 1966 | A Beautiful Pea-green Boat | Donald Bull | Peter Sasdy | starring Bernard Lee with Robert Brown, Sandra Dorne, Meg Wynn Owen, Gregory Phillips, Geraldine Sherman and guest star, Derek Francis Cast in order of appearance: Ben King: Robert Brown; Nat: Reg Lye; Alf: Ivor Salter; Nel: Sandra Dorne; Alice King: Mona Bruce; Joss King: Bernard Lee; Saul King: Gregory Phillips; Malory: Derek Francis; Susanna King: Geraldine Sherman; Ruth King: Meg Wynn Owen; Cedric: Paul Williamson; Charlie: Sydney Arnold; Reporters: Hal Jeayes; Reporters: Billy Cornelius; Les: John Boyd-Brent; Sam: Declan Mulholland; Beaumont: Geoffrey Denton; Secretary: Anthony Dawes; Steward: Richard Davies; Lancing: Christopher Banks; Willie: Gerald Rowland | |
| 14 September 1966 | Keeping The Old Spirit Alive | Fred Watson | Peter Cregeen | starring Bernard Lee with Sandra Dorne, Gregory Phillips and Geraldine Sherman; Guest stars, Eddie Byrne, Tony Selby Cast in order of appearance: Susanna King: Geraldine Sherman; Western: Roland Curram; Jag: Tony Selby; Mick: Julian Holloway; Joss King: Bernard Lee; Saul King: Gregory Phillps; Irishman: Harry Towb; Sam Pelham: Eddie Byrne; Jack Flynn I: David Daker; Nel: Sandra Dorne; Young man: Christopher Stephens; Dockers: Joe Quigley; Dockers: Henry Manning; Dockers: Ron Welling | |
| 28 September 1966 | Flash Point | Cyril Abraham | Eric Hills | starring Bernard Lee with Sandra Dorne, Meg Wynn Owen, Gregory Phillips, Geraldine Sherman; Guest star, Patrick McAlinney Cast in order of appearance: Joss King: Bernard Lee; Ruth: Meg Wynn Owen; Susanna: Geraldine Sherman; Saul: Gregory Phillips; Nel: Sandra Dorne; Sammy: Bill Kenwright; Lofty: Dyson Lovell; Dominic: Patrick McAlinney; Bosun: Richard Shaw; Mr Poole: Robert Dean; Mr Maybrick: Edwin Brown; Tally clerk: Peter Thomas; Pilot: Ralph Nossek; Quartermaster: Patrick Milner; Captain Friar: Howard Lang; R/Operator: Denis Cleary | |
| 5 October 1966 | The Great Albert Mystery | Donald Bull | Philip Dudley | starring Bernard Lee with Robert Brown, Sandra Dorne, Geraldine Sherman; Guest stars, Joseph Brady, James Ellis Cast in order of appearance: Charlie: Wally Patch; Fred: Artro Morris; Ted: Joe Gladwin; Nel: Sandra Dorne; Susanna King: Geraldine Sherman; Ben King: Robert Brown; Joe: Edward Higgins; Andrew: Joseph Brady; Joss King: Bernard Lee; Alice King: Mona Bruce; Sam: Laurie Webb; Visitor: James Ellis | |
| 12 October 1966 | Teacher's Honeymoon | | | starring Bernard Lee with Sandra Dorne, Meg Wynn Owen, Gregory Phillips Cast in order of appearance: Joss King: Bernard Lee; Ben King: Robert Brown; Saul King: Gregory Phillips; Ruth King: Meg Wynn Owen; Susanna King: Geraldine Sherman; Nel: Sandra Dorne; Nat: Reg Lye; Cedric: Paul Williamson | |
| 19 October 1966 | Susanna Goes Fishing | Donald Bull | Paul Ciappessoni | with Robert Brown, Sandra Dorne, Geraldine Sherman; Guest stars, David Bauer, John Slater, Paul Whitsun-Jones Cast in order of appearance: Susanna King: Geraldine Sherman; Alice King: Mona Bruce; Ben King: Robert Brown; Jason: David Bauer; Nel: Sandra Dorne; Ronnie Binns: Paul Thompson; Bob Elliott: Frazer Hines; Jack Elliott: John Slater; Red Elliott: Douglas Blackwell; Binns: Walter Sparrow; Waiter: John Halstead; Mr Jones: Paul Whitsun-Jones; Sid: Christopher Hodge; The Rev Ackroyd: George A. Cooper; Truck driver: Peter Braham | |
| 26 October 1966 | The End of the Voyage | Colin Morris | Peter Cregeen | starring Bernard Lee with Robert Brown, Sandra Dorne, Gregory Phillips, Geraldine Sherman; Guest star, Jack Smethurst Cast in order of appearance: Joss King: Bernard Lee; Saul King: Gregory Phillips; Mr Bell: John Gill; Susanna King: Geraldine Sherman; Bob Elliot: Frazer Hines; Ben King: Robert Brown; Joe Atkinson: Terry Bale; Nel: Sandra Dorne; Betty: Jean Marlow; Charlie: Wally Patch; Gelder: John Graham; Nancy: Elaine Paige; Peter: Jack Smethurst; The Rev Ackroyd: George A. Cooper; Sam: John Warden; Doctor: Derek Smee; Engineer: Laurie Webb | |
| 19 February 1967 | The Romantic Dentist | Fred Watson | Terence Williams | starring Bernard Lee with Sandra Dorne, Meg Wynn Owen, Gregory Phillips and guest star Meredith Edwards Cast in order of appearance: Joss King: Bernard Lee; Saul King: Gregory Phillips; Elspeth Conway: Iris Russell; Sandra: Bernadette Milnes; Dick Conway: Meredith Edwards; Ruth King: Meg Wynn Owen; Joanne Conway: Georgina Patterson; Dr Wirrel: Arnold Bell; Nel: Sandra Dorne; Charlie: Wally Patch; Terry: Frederic Lees; Peak: Robert McBain; Crown: Royston Tickner; First Mod: Malcolm Kaye | |
