= Laurie Webb =

Welsh actor (1924–2026)

- Webb circa 2016
- Born: Lawrence/Laurence (Note: His name is spelt Lawrence in the GRO Birth Index but Laurence in the Probate Index.) Melvin Henry Webb; 6 May 1924; Newport, Monmouthshire, Wales
- Died: 29 March 2026 (aged 101)
- Occupation: Actor
- Years active: 1932–1960 • 1966–1975 • 1986 • 2016
- Notable work: Doctor Who; Hancock's Half Hour; Paul Temple; Doomwatch
- Military career
- Allegiance: United Kingdom
- Branch: British Army
- Service years: 19??–1947
- Rank: Sergeant Major
- Conflicts: World War II

Lawrence/Laurence Melvin Henry Webb (6 May 1924 – 29 March 2026) was a Welsh actor known for his roles in television series such as Doctor Who, Hancock's Half Hour, Paul Temple and Doomwatch.

Webb started his television career in 1958, appearing on Sid Caesar's TV series Sid Caesar Invites You.

== Early life ==
Webb was born in Newport, Monmouthshire on 6 May 1924. During the Second World War, he served in the British Army as a sergeant major with the Royal Corps of Signals. He took part in the Normandy landings in 1944 and subsequently was stationed in France and Germany during the conflict. He was later sent to the far east and was discharged on 24 August 1947. He was awarded medals on 7 July 1950.

== Early career ==
Webb was an accomplished singer and dancer and had a very successful career in the theatre, getting his first role in 1932 at just eight years old, touring for two weeks in a farce called Lend Me Your Wife. Within 10 days of his discharge from the Army he was back on stage, starting a three-year theatre tour with The Dancing Years. The rest of his career saw Webb moving from one show to another, and in between productions taking TV roles that came up. He had sizeable stage parts with billing in London’s West End and played Grumio in Shakespeare's Taming of the Shrew at Chichester. Webb joined the cast of Guys and Dolls when it started in 1953 at the Coliseum in London’s West End. Sidney James joined the show near the end of its run and they both joined the tour which opened at The Golders Green Hippodrome in November 1955. Webb and James became friends, socialising and playing golf together. They later appeared on television together in Hancock’s Half Hour and Citizen James. Webb appeared in stage musicals up to 1984. When he retired he became bored and passed The Knowledge in just 20 months to become a London black cab driver.

Webb was a regular cast member of the TV comedy series Hancock's Half Hour, and featured in numerous guest roles on television series including King of the River, The Troubleshooters, Paul Temple and science fiction series Doomwatch.

== Doctor Who ==
Webb played Mr Arthur Ollis in the 10th anniversary serial The Three Doctors (1972–1973). He became the oldest-living person associated with the show following Arnold Yarrow's death on 9 December 2024.

On 31 May 2025, he attended a signing event in Chiswick with fellow Doctor Who actor Katy Manning and is believed to be the oldest to do so.

== Personal life and death ==
Webb, an avid golfer, celebrated his centenary by playing nine holes of golf at Pyrford Lakes Golf Club as a fundraiser for Alzheimer's Society.

Webb died on 29 March 2026, at the age of 101.

== Filmography ==
=== Television ===
Year	Title	Role	Notes
1958	Sid Caesar Invites You	Himself	1 episode
1958	Hancock's Half Hour	1st Electrician	Episode: "Ericson the Viking"
1959	Hancock's Half Hour	3rd Soldier	Episode: "The Horror Serial"
1959	Hancock's Half Hour	2nd Workman	Episode: "The Oak Tree"
1959	Hancock's Half Hour	Man	Episode: "The Economy Drive"
1959	Hancock's Half Hour	Steward	Episode: "The Cruise"
1959	Hancock's Half Hour	2nd spectator	Episode: "Football Pools"
1959	The Eustace Diamonds	Bogson	2 episodes
1960	Hancock's Half Hour	Man in Off Licence	Episode: "The Reunion Party"
1960	Hancock's Half Hour	Bus conductor	Episode: "The Ladies' Man"
1960	Hancock's Half Hour	2nd tourist	Episode: "The Photographer"
1960	Citizen James	Unknown	3 episodes
1966	Cooperama	Unknown	Episode: "Episode Two"
1966	King of the River	Sam	Episode: "The Great Albert Mystery"
1966	King of the River	Engineer	Episode: "The End of the Voyage"
1966	Mogul	Attendant	Episode: "Happy Landings"
1967	Mickey Dunne	Lennie Carson	Episode: "No Flowers by Request"
1967	Mickey Dunne	Lennie	Episode: "Are there any more at Home like You?"
1970	The Troubleshooters	Smith	Episode: "Operation Black Gold"
1970	The Troubleshooters	Panel Operator	Episode: "Hey, We've Got a Problem Here"
1971	Paul Temple	Barman	Episode: "The Specialists"
1971	Doomwatch	Dog Owner	Episode: "The Inquest"
1971	Brett	Senator Loman	Episode: "The Trump Card"
1972	Comedy Playhouse	Postman	Episode: "And Whose Side Are You On?
1972–1973	Doctor Who	Mr Ollis	Serial: The Three Doctors
1973	Warship	Customs Officer	Episode: "Hot Pursuit"
1973	The Goodies	Man on sofa	Uncredited; episode: "The Goodies and the Beanstalk"
1975	The Brothers	Superintendent	Episode: "Special Licence"
1975	Softly, Softly: Task Force	Trade Market Gateman	Episode: "Female of the Species"
1986	The Clairvoyant	Customer	Episode: "Episode #1.1"
2023	Tales of the TARDIS	Mr Ollis	Archive footage; episode: "The Three Doctors"

=== Audio ===
Year	Title	Role	Notes
2016	Toby Hadoke's Who's Round	Himself	Podcast; episode: "Laurie Webb"

== See also ==
- List of centenarians (actors, filmmakers and entertainers)
