= Geraldine Sherman =

British actress, writer, and theatre producer

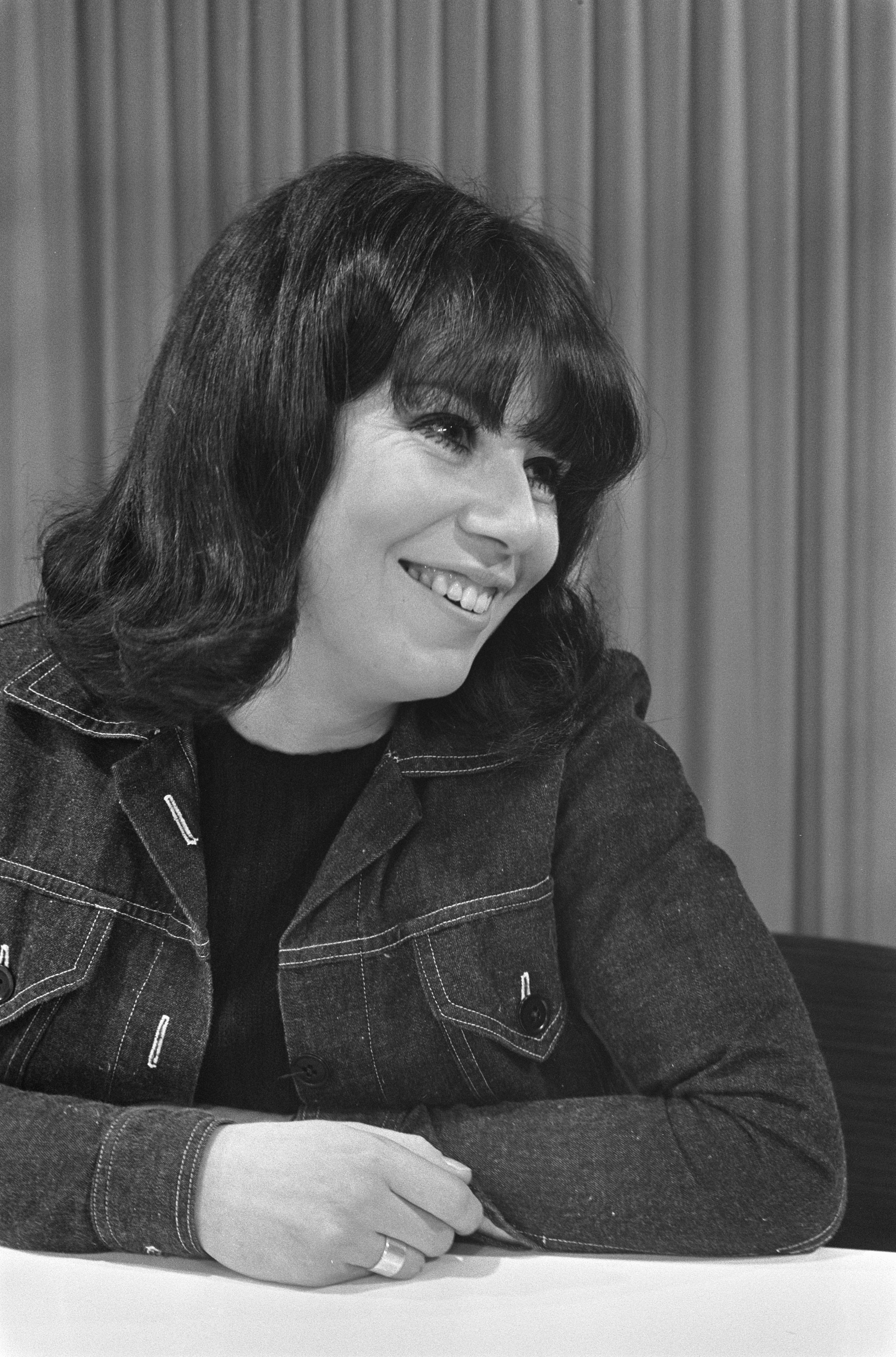
- Born: Geraldine Judith Schoenmann; Staines, Middlesex, England
- Other name: Dena Hammerstein
- Occupations: Actress; writer; theatre producer
- Years active: 1964 – present
- Spouse: James Hammerstein (197x? – 1999)
- Children: 1

Geraldine Sherman (born Geraldine Judith Schoenmann) known as Dena Hammerstein, is a British actress and writer, and theatre producer. She was the third wife of James Hammerstein, and after his death became president/CEO of James Hammerstein Productions Ltd.

== Early life ==
Sherman was born in Staines, Middlesex. Her parents were refugees from Czechoslovakia. Her father Kurt Wilhelm Schoenmann was born in Teplice in 1915. He married Edith Peller, later coming to Britain to escape Nazi persecution, but was interned in March 1940 because his nationality was Austrian. He was then transported to Australia on the infamous 1940 Dunera voyage, and held in Loveday and Tatura internment camps until 1942.

Dena came from a bedsit in Ladbroke Grove, long before Notting Hill became fashionable.

Her parents were Jewish refugees. When Dena – Geraldine Sherman – was born, her father was in an internment camp in Australia and her nervous mother sent her out of London to the safety of a Jewish orphanage in Shenfield, Essex.

The kindly matron was her mother figure, so, when she was sent back to live with her parents at the age of 11, she was miserable.

"All I wanted was to go back to the orphanage," she says. "I was embarrassed by my parents, by their broken English and their permanent refugee complex. I hadn't been brought up to think that every time the doorbell rang, it was the Gestapo."

One happy memory from the orphanage to which she clung during the difficult years with her parents was of an outing to the theatre. "We were taken to see a frothy pink and white fantasy show," she remembers.

"Afterwards, I was taken to the stage door and I didn't have my arm through the sleeve of my jacket, so it was hanging loose. When the star came out, she said: 'Would the little girl with only one arm please step forward?' I immediately put on a limp as well and, from that moment, I was on the road to make-believe."

At the age of 17, she ran away to join a theatre group.

— I was on the road to make-believe – Cassandra Jardine, The Telegraph, 16 June 2004

== Actress ==
Film
Year	Title	Role	Notes
1964	A Hard Day's Night	Girl Outside Secondhand Shop	Uncredited
1967	Poor Cow	Trixie	
1968	Interlude	Natalie	
1968	Deadfall	Delgado's Receptionist	
1968	The Bliss of Mrs. Blossom	Dr. Krunhauser	
1968	Song of Summer	Girl next door	TV series documentary
1969	Take a Girl Like You	Anna Le Page	
1970	There's a Girl in My Soup	Caroline	
1971	Get Carter	Girl in Café	
1971	Cry of the Penguins	Penny	
1995	Thin Ice	Dena	
1997	Bent	Prostitute	(final film role)

Television
Date	Title	Role	Notes
1964	Foreign Affairs	peasant girl	Granada Television
1 July 1964	Catch Hand: Stop Counting at One	Marian	BBC tv
25 August 1964	Love Story: Arranged for Strings	Miss Fish	ATV
18 September 1964	The Big Noise, or Episodes in the Uneasy Life of a Top Pop Disc Jockey	Jackie	BBC tv
3 November 1965	Up the Junction	Rube	BBC tv
9 March 1966	Softly, Softly: The Key	Eileen Murphy	BBC tv
4 June 1966	Juke Box Jury	Self – panellist	BBC tv
6 July 1966 – 26 October 1966	King of the River	Susanna King	BBC tv 15 episodes:
30 January 1967	Till Death Us Do Part: A Woman's Place is in the Home		BBC tv
4 March 1967	Juke Box Jury	Self – panellist	BBC tv
22 April 1967 – 13 May 1967	The Forsyte Saga	Victorine Bicket	BBC tv 4 episodes: Part 16: A Family Wedding; Part 17: The White Monkey; Part 18: Afternoon of a Dryad; Part 19: No Retreat
13 December 1967	The Wednesday Play: Death of a Private	Mary	BBC tv
10 April 1968	Thirty-Minute Theatre: The Sinner	the Girl	BBC tv
13 April 1968	Public Eye: Cross That Palm When We Come to It	Fay	ABC Television
30 October 1968	The Wednesday Play: A Bit of Crucifixion, Father	Sheila	BBC tv
18 January 1969	ITV Sunday Night Theatre: Bangelstein's Boys	Dick's Girl	LWT
9 November 1969	Strange Report: Report 2475: Revenge - When a Man Hates	Secretary	Arena Productions
19 November 1969	The Wednesday Play: There is also Tomorrow	Rosemary	BBC tv
15 December 1969	The Root of All Evil?: Bloxham's Concerto for Critic and Carpenter	Pippa	Yorkshire Television
19 April 1970	Play of the Month: E. M. Forster's Howards End	Jacky	BBC tv
4 January 1971	Doomwatch: The Islanders	Alice	BBC tv
21 October 1971	Play for Today: Edna, the Inebriate Woman	Trudi	BBC tv
30 June 1976 – 7 July 1976	Killers: The Stinie Morrison Case	Nellie Deitch	Thames Television 2 episodes:
3 January 1982	Little Miss Perkins	Mrs. Issacs	LWT
21 November 1982	The Professionals: You'll Be All Right	Chrissie Stone	LWT
11 October 1992	Screen One: Running Late	Mrs Zee	BBC tv
10 December 1996	Soldier Soldier: Hell and High Water	Mrs. Beryl Grey	Central Independent Television

Stage
Date	Title	Role	Theatre	Notes
31 October 1972 – 24 February 1973	Butley	Miss Heasman	Morosco Theatre, New York	

== Writer ==
When It's Over, by Geraldine Sherman and Eduardo Machado:

Long Wharf Theatre, New Haven, Connecticut: playreading 1985–1986, workshop 1986–1987
Finborough Theatre, London, 23 October – 16 November 1991

Thin Ice, 1995 film

== Theatre producer ==
Theatre Producer (Dena Hammerstein)
Dates	Title	Author	Director	Theatre	Notes
1 August 1996 – 27 July 2008	I Love You, You're Perfect, Now Change	Joe DiPietro and music by Jimmy Roberts	Joel Bishoff	Westside Theatre (Upstairs), New York	
6 January 2004 – 22 February 2004	Allegro	Rodgers & Hammerstein	Eric Schaeffer	Signature Theatre, Arlington, Virginia	
16 June 2004 – 28 August 2004	Dirty Blonde	Claudia Shear	James Lapine	Duke of York's Theatre, London	
1 October 2005 – 13 November 2005	Slut	Ben H. Winters & Stephen Sislen	Gordon Greenberg	American Theater of Actors / Century Promenade, New York	
13 May 2006 – 22 July 2006	Sunday in the Park with George	Stephen Sondheim & James Lapine	Sam Buntrock	Wyndhams Theatre, London	
15 October 2006 – 17 December 2006	My Name Is Rachel Corrie	Alan Rickman and Katharine Viner	Alan Rickman	Minetta Lane Theatre, New York	
11 December 2007 – 29 March 2008	Dealer's Choice	Patrick Marber	Samuel West	Trafalgar Studios, London	
2 October 2008 – 21 December 2008	The Seagull	Anton Chekhov, new version by Christopher Hampton, music by Stephen Warbeck	Ian Rickson	Walter Kerr Theatre, New York	
26 February 2009 – 12 September 2010	Our Town	Thornton Wilder	David Cromer	Barrow Street Theatre, New York	
1 October 2009 – 3 January 2010	Superior Donuts	Tracy Letts	Tina Landau	Music Box Theatre, New York	
27 April 2010 – 9 May 2010	Enron	Lucy Prebble (words), Adam Cork (music)	Rupert Goold	Broadhurst Theatre, New York	
31 May 2011 – 27 August 2011	Butley	Simon Gray	Lindsay Posner	Duchess Theatre, London	
15 January 2015 – 5 April 2015	Honeymoon in Vegas	Jason Robert Brown	Gary Griffin	Nederlander Theatre, New York	

== Philanthropist ==
Dena Hammerstein worked as a volunteer in New York City hospitals for over 15 years, and in 2003 received the United Hospital Funds New Leadership Group's Humanitarian Award. She is Founder of Only Make Believe, a non-profit organisation that creates and performs interactive theatre for children in hospitals and care facilities, inspired by her early work as an actress in the UK touring special-needs schools.

Her greatest pride is reserved for the charity, "Only Make Believe", which she founded with the idea of letting the theatre help institutionalised children as it had once helped her. At first, she had thought of taking sick children to the theatre, but it was such a problem getting them there that they were too exhausted to enjoy the shows.

Instead, she has brought the theatre to the children. The actors arrive with a large dressing-up trunk to rehearse a play in hospital using a script by Dena and children as performers.

— I was on the road to make-believe – Cassandra Jardine, The Telegraph, 16 June 2004

== Personal life ==
In 1970, a choreographer friend invited her to holiday in New York where she met Jamie Hammerstein.

Married theatre director James Hammerstein who directed her in Butley, and has one son Simon Hammerstein (born 1977).
