= Douglas Blackwell =

English actor (1924–2009)

- Born: 17 May 1924; Gloucester, Gloucestershire, England
- Died: 17 October 2009 (aged 85); Victoria, London, England
- Occupation: Actor
- Years active: 1950–2006
- Spouse: Brenda Mary Planner (b. 1937) (m. 1979; died 2008)

Douglas Blackwell (17 May 1924 – 17 October 2009) was an English actor. Douglas Blackwell was born in Gloucester, Gloucestershire, England but brought up in Port Talbot, Wales, where he attended the local county grammar school. In 1942, he won a prize at the Youth Eisteddfod at Pontypridd for his play 'Branch Line'. He narrated the 1990s Mr Men audio cassettes. His television appearances included roles in Softly, Softly, The Avengers, Z-Cars, The 10th Kingdom and Dixon of Dock Green. He also appeared in films such as: A Prize of Arms (1962), The Ipcress File (1965), 10 Rillington Place (1971), Labyrinth (1986) and Robin Hood: Prince of Thieves (1991).

== TV and film credits ==
Year	Title	Role	Notes
1950	Sunday Night Theatre	Marlin	1 episode
1951	Treasure Island	Israel Hands	3 Episodes
1952	Hunted	Detective Sergeant Grayson	
1952	The Infinite Shoeblack		TV movie
1953	Robin Hood		1 episode
1956	It's a Wonderful World	1st Demonstrator	
1956	Panic in the Parlour	Co-op Man	Uncredited
1958	The Diary of Samuel Pepys	Master Daniels	Episode: #10
1958	I Was Monty's Double	Duty Sergeant	Uncredited
1962	A Prize of Arms	Day	Uncredited
1963	The Scarlet Blade	Blake	
1964	The Plane Makers	Jack Wilks	1 episode
1965	The Ipcress File	Murray	
1966	King of the River	Red Elliot / Police Constable	2 episodes
1967	The Queen's Traitor	Corporal of the Guard	1 episode
1968	The Avengers	Postman	1 episode
1968	The Big Switch	Bruno Miglio	
1957-1969	Armchair Theatre	Frank Hobson / Bill / Sgt. Briggs / David / Lloyd / PC Cluff	7 episodes
1971	10 Rillington Place	Workman Jones	
1962-1973	Z-Cars	Leonard Slingsby / Bert Scholes / Parkyn / Morgan / Evans / Teddy Hayes	8 episodes
1979	The Strange Affair of Adelaide Harris	Sir Walter Sorley	2 episodes
1980	Noah's Castle	Butcher	2 episodes
1985	By the Sword Divided	First Customer	1 episode
1986	Labyrinth	Goblin and The Four Guards	Voice
1987	Wicked City	Healer	(UK dub), English version, voice, uncredited
1989	Asterix and the Big Fight	Vitalstatistix	English version, voice
1990	Peter in Magicland	Moon Man	English version, voice
1991	Robin Hood: Prince of Thieves	Gray-Bearded Baron	
1991	30 Door Key		
1999	Asterix & Obelix Take On Caesar	Vitalstatistix	English version, voice
2001	The Bunker		Voice (final film role)

== Radio ==
Parsley Sidings -('Pass the Parcel', episode) Voices of: The Major. The Doorman. Series 2, episode 1. Broadcast: saturday, 29th September, 1973, 1p.m., Radio 2. Recorded: Wednesday, 25th October, 1972.
