= The Three Doctors (Doctor Who) =

065 – The Three Doctors
- Doctor Who serial
- Omega explains things before two of the three Doctors and Sergeant Benton

Cast
- Doctors: Jon Pertwee – Third Doctor; Patrick Troughton – Second Doctor; William Hartnell – First Doctor
- Companion: Katy Manning – Jo Grant
- Others: Nicholas Courtney – Brigadier Lethbridge-Stewart; John Levene – Sergeant Benton; Stephen Thorne – Omega; Roy Purcell – President of the Council; Clyde Pollitt – Chancellor; Graham Leaman – Time Lord; Rex Robinson – Dr. Tyler; Laurie Webb – Mr. Ollis; Patricia Prior – Mrs. Ollis; Denys Palmer – Corporal Palmer

Production
- Directed by: Lennie Mayne
- Written by: Bob Baker; Dave Martin
- Script editor: Terrance Dicks
- Produced by: Barry Letts
- Music by: Dudley Simpson
- Production code: RRR
- Series: Season 10
- Running time: 4 episodes, 25 minutes each
- First broadcast: 30 December 1972
- Last broadcast: 20 January 1973

Chronology
← Preceded by The Time Monster	Followed by → Carnival of Monsters

The Three Doctors is the first serial of the tenth season of the British science fiction television series Doctor Who, first broadcast in four weekly parts on BBC1 from 30 December 1972 to 20 January 1973.

In the serial, the solar engineer Omega (Stephen Thorne), the creator of the experiments that allowed the Time Lords to travel in time, seeks revenge on the Time Lords after he was left for dead in a universe made of antimatter. The Time Lords recruit the time travellers the First Doctor (William Hartnell), the Second Doctor (Patrick Troughton), and the Third Doctor (Jon Pertwee) for help when Omega drains power throughout the universe, threatening all of existence.

The serial opened the tenth anniversary year of the series, and features the first three Doctors all appearing in the same serial. This makes it the first Doctor Who story in which an earlier incarnation of the Doctor returns to the show. It was also Hartnell's last appearance as the First Doctor prior to his death in 1975. Omega would later return to the series in the 1983 serial Arc of Infinity, the 2020 episode "The Timeless Children", and the 2025 two-parter "Wish World" / "The Reality War". The story also marks the end of the Doctor's exile to Earth by the Time Lords, ending a plot device begun prior to Pertwee's tenure, from 1969's The War Games.

== Plot ==
A superluminal signal is sent to Earth, carrying with it an energy blob that seems intent on capturing the Doctor, but has already mysteriously abducted two individuals: a local game warden, and scientific researcher Dr. Tyler. Gallifrey, the homeworld of the Time Lords, is also under siege; they themselves are trapped, with universal energy being drained through a black hole, threatening to unravel the fabric of time and space. Desperate to send help, the Time Lords break the First Law of Time by recruiting a previous incarnation of the Doctor from his own past. As the Second Doctor and the present Third Doctor cannot cope with each other's personalities, the Time Lords attempt to retrieve the First Doctor to "keep them in order", but he is trapped in a "time eddy", unable to fully materialise, communicating through a viewscreen. The Doctors investigate, while UNIT headquarters faces an attack by shapeless lumpy-globule-like creatures. The First Doctor assists both Doctors by correctly surmising that the previously-sent energy blob is a bridge to another universe. The Third Doctor attempts to go alone, but Jo is abruptly abducted with him. The Second Doctor later allows the TARDIS with himself, the Brigadier, and Benton inside, to be taken by the blob, although this causes UNIT HQ to be stolen as well.

Jo, the Third Doctor, and Dr. Tyler, whom they discover there, assess their situation in this new mystery universe of antimatter, inside the black hole. The Third Doctor also deduces that a conversion has taken place for their assailants and themselves to somehow exist in each other's universes without annihilation. Before they can do any more, though, they are accosted by the shapeless creatures and taken to an unfamiliar location. When they arrive, they meet the legendary Time Lord Omega, who created the supernova method that powers Time Lord civilisation, but which also supposedly killed him. Omega seeks revenge on the Time Lords, whom he assumes left him stranded alone for centuries in his universe, of which he explains that he willed into existence. Assuming he has been deceived once again by the Time Lords after discovering the Second Doctor and correctly deducing his identity, Omega imprisons both Doctors, Jo, Benton, and Tyler. After the two Doctors help everyone escape through both of their own willpowers, Omega discovers the getaway, and challenges the Third Doctor to a battle of minds, nearly killing him.

The Second Doctor convinces Omega to stop, appealing to his desire to escape. Now calmer, Omega explains further to the two that he shaped this reality within the black hole both with his willpower and the power of its singularity. However, due to this, his will is the only support keeping this reality stable. He cannot freely leave without releasing control, but releasing control would collapse the antimatter universe instantly, annihilating everything in it; and so Omega's intention is for the Doctors to take his place maintaining it. As he prepares to leave with the Doctors' help, they are stunned to find that the extremely prolonged exposure to the singularity has destroyed Omega's physical body; his willpower now also maintains his essence, and he will cease to exist if he leaves. Suffering a nervous breakdown from the shock, Omega now seeks to destroy all creation.

Taking advantage of his neurosis, the two Doctors escape back to the TARDIS with all of the abductees. With the First Doctor, the two devise a way to defeat Omega. By accident, the two also discover the Second Doctor's previously-lost recorder within the TARDIS' force field generator, and integrate it into their plan. The two meet with Omega again, claiming they can give him his freedom. Omega, though, sharply retorts that he cannot be freed, and demands that they share his exile. The Doctors agree, on the condition that all of his abductees are sent safely back to Earth. Once done, the two present him with the generator. Omega knocks it over in rage at the paltry offer and the recorder falls out; having fallen into the generator during the abduction, the recorder was protected from conversion, remaining as normal matter. The resulting contact annihilates the antimatter universe, creating a new universal source of energy, and ejecting the Doctors in the TARDIS, UNIT HQ, and all of its stolen objects, back to their proper places in the normal universe. With the Time Lords' power restored, they return the First and Second Doctors to their respective time periods.

Forlorn, the Third Doctor implies to Jo that death was the only freedom anyone could offer Omega. Out of forgiveness, the Time Lords then send the Doctor a new dematerialisation circuit for the TARDIS and restore his knowledge of how to travel through space and time, lifting his exile.

== Production ==
Working titles for this story included The Black Hole. The script was originally supposed to feature all three Doctors equally, but William Hartnell was too ill to be able to play the full role as envisioned. He was, therefore, reduced to a pre-recorded cameo role, appearing only on the TARDIS's scanner and the space-time viewer of the Time Lords. It would be the last time he played the Doctor and his last acting role before his death in 1975. Hartnell's scenes were filmed at BBC's Ealing Studios.

The only time that all three Doctors appeared together was in promotional photos for the story. One session of these took place in October 1972 at a photo studio in Battersea – this produced the image that was used for the cover of the Radio Times magazine to promote the story.

The production team also planned for Frazer Hines to reprise his role of Jamie McCrimmon alongside the Second Doctor; however, Hines was not available, due to his work on the soap opera Emmerdale Farm. Much of the role originally intended for Jamie was reassigned to Sergeant Benton.

=== Casting notes ===
The Chancellor is portrayed by Clyde Pollitt, who had also played one of the Time Lords who tried and exiled the Second Doctor. Barry Letts states in the DVD commentary that this was intentional, as he meant for this to be the same character. Similarly, Graham Leaman reappears as a Time Lord, having been seen in the same role in Colony in Space (1971) discussing the Master's activities and the Time Lords' use of the exiled Doctor as an agent. The same DVD commentary and the on-screen production captions note that the unavailability of actor Richard Franklin led to a shifting of the roles by the UNIT supporting cast. Sergeant Benton took on the majority of the role written for Captain Yates and a new character, Corporal Palmer, took on most of the lines originally written for Benton.

== Reception ==
Episode	Title	Run time	Original release date	UK viewers (millions)	Archive
1	"Episode One"	24:39	30 December 1972	9.6	PAL 2" colour videotape
2	"Episode Two"	24:18	6 January 1973	10.8	PAL 2" colour videotape
3	"Episode Three"	24:22	13 January 1973	8.8	PAL 2" colour videotape
4	"Episode Four"	25:07	20 January 1973	11.9	PAL 2" colour videotape

Patrick Mulkern of Radio Times wrote that The Three Doctors "may not be the greatest story ever told" but it ended the Doctor's exile on Earth and brought back Troughton, though unfortunately Hartnell was not able to do much. The A.V. Club reviewer Christopher Bahn summarised that the serial "has some good ideas in it, but they're treated with such an unambitious lack of imagination that there's not enough actually happening here for the story to be offensively bad—just boring". He felt the "most enjoyable part" was the "comic squabbling" between Pertwee and Troughton, and also called the Brigadier a "saving grace". DVD Talk's Ian Jane gave the serial three out of five stars, noting that it was "slightly silly" and the production designs and special effects were "definitely not the best that the series has had to offer". He also felt that the story was wrapped up too quickly and was "fairly predictable". However, he praised Pertwee and Troughton's interplay, the fact that Jo was given more to do, and Stephen Thorne's performance as Omega. Alisdair Wilkins of io9 picked The Three Doctors as the worst Doctor Who story of the classic series, feeling that the Second Doctor and the Brigadier were written as too comical, the story had too much padding, and that Omega was a "shouting, one-dimensional villain".

=== Broadcast ===
The serial was repeated on BBC2 in November 1981, daily (Monday–Thursday) (23 November 1981 to 26 November 1981) at 17:40 as part of "The Five Faces of Doctor Who". The four episodes achieved ratings of 5.0, 4.5, 5.7 and 5.8 million viewers respectively.

== Commercial releases ==
=== In print ===
The Three Doctors
- Author: Terrance Dicks
- Cover artist: Chris Achilleos
- Series: Doctor Who book: Target novelisations
- Release number: 64
- Publisher: Target Books
- Publication date: 20 November 1975
- ISBN: 0-426-11578-3

A novelisation of this serial, written by Terrance Dicks, was published by Target Books in November 1975.

The novelisation provides a rationale for Omega's realm to be a quarry; over the millennia, Omega has become weary of the mental effort required to generate a verdant landscape, and now makes do with rock and soil. The Second Doctor is referred to throughout as Doctor Two. In the book, Mr Ollis is renamed Mr Hollis. It is stated that Omega is only the second Time Lord that the Doctor has come up against as an adversary, the first being the Master.

=== Home media ===
The Three Doctors was released twice on VHS, first in August 1991 and thereafter remastered and re-released in 2002 as part of the WHSmith's The Time Lord Collection boxed set. It was released on DVD in the UK in November 2003 as part of the Doctor Who 40th Anniversary Celebration releases, representing the Jon Pertwee years. Some copies came in a box set housing a limited edition Corgi model of "Bessie", the Third Doctor's vintage roadster. A special edition of the DVD, with new bonus features, was released in the UK on 13 February 2012 in the third of the ongoing Revisitations DVD box sets with additional bonus features. In 2019, The Three Doctors was released as part of the Season Ten Boxed Set Blu-Ray collection. The story and its special features occupy one disc in the set, and include features from previous releases and specially-made content.

=== Tales of the TARDIS ===
A special edition of the episode aired on BBC iPlayer on 1 November 2023, in the spin-off Tales of the TARDIS.
