= Patricia Prior =

English actress (1929–2023)

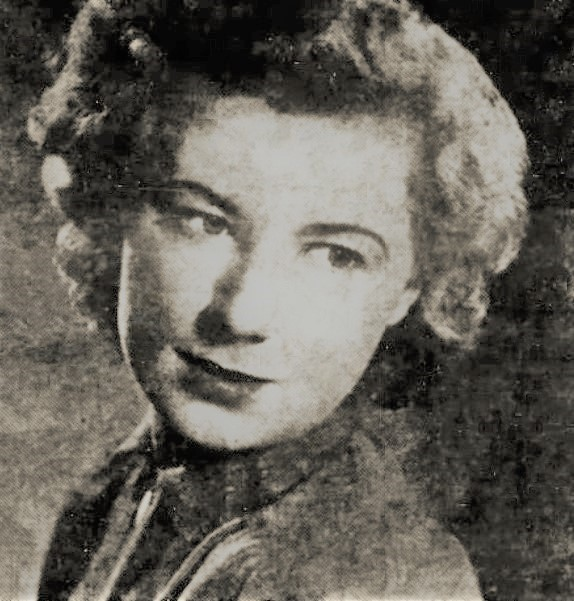
- Patricia Prior, Leicester Theatre Royal, 1950
- Born: Patricia Mary Prior; 9 February 1929; Bradfield, Essex, England
- Died: 12 June 2023 (aged 94); Addlestone, Surrey, England
- Occupation: Actress
- Years active: 1948–1989
- Spouse: Rex Robinson (m. 1952; died 2015)

Patricia Prior (9 February 1929 – 12 June 2023) was an English actress. Best known for playing Mrs. Gibson in The Onedin Line, she also appeared in the Doctor Who television series.

== Formative years and family ==
Born in Bradfield, Essex, England in 1929, Prior was educated in the schools of Stratford-on-Avon and then received training as an actress at the Royal Academy of Dramatic Art in London.

In 1952, Prior married her fellow actor Rex Robinson, whom she met on a tour of South Africa. Robinson was also a member of the cast of The Three Doctors.

== Career ==
After receiving her artistic training, Prior performed with the Guildford Repertory Company. By January of 1950, she was performing "character and 'straight' roles" with the Theatre Royal Saxon Players in Leicester.

Prior appeared in the Doctor Who serial The Three Doctors directed by Lennie Mayne as Mrs. Ollis.

== Death ==
Prior died in Addlestone, Surrey, England on 12 June 2023.

== Selected filmography ==
Year	Title	Role	Notes
1989	Shadow of the Noose	Mrs. Potter	
1989	In Sickness and in Health	Woman In Street	
1987	You Must Be the Husband	The Lady	
1987	One by One	Elsie Gates	
1986	Strong Medicine	Martin's Mother	
1983	Storyboard	Mrs. Rook	
1982	Saturday Night Thriller	Mrs. Bannister	
1970	Play for Today	Mrs. Tomishita	
1971	The Onedin Line	Mrs. Gibson (14 episodes 1977–1980)	
1976	Softly, Softly: Task Force	Mrs. Tegman	
1975	The Brothers	Doctor's Receptionist	
1973	Warship	Diana Bennett	
1972–1973	Doctor Who	Mrs Ollis	Serial: The Three Doctors
1972	Monty Python's Flying Circus	Patient Russian	
1965	The Troubleshooters	Secretary	
1967	Mickey Dunne	Woman	
