= Rex Robinson (actor) =

British actor (1926–2015)

- Born: Reginald Cecil Robinson; 26 June 1926; Derby, Derbyshire, England
- Died: 13 April 2015 (aged 88); Addlestone, Surrey, England
- Occupation: Actor
- Spouse: Patricia Prior (m. 1952)

Reginald Cecil "Rex" Robinson (26 June 1926 – 13 April 2015) was a British actor.

He appeared in three Doctor Who serials directed by Lennie Mayne: as Dr. Tyler in The Three Doctors, Gebek in The Monster of Peladon and Dr. Carter in The Hand of Fear. Other acting roles include Z-Cars, No Hiding Place, The Onedin Line, Within These Walls, Terry and June, The Professionals, Only Fools and Horses, Yes Minister, Are You Being Served? and the films A Nightingale Sang in Berkeley Square and Superman IV: The Quest for Peace.

== Filmography ==
Year	Title	Role	Notes
1958	Champion Road	Tommy Dog	2 episodes
1972	Upstairs, Downstairs	Inspector Hurst	Episode: The Swedish Tiger
1972–1976	Doctor Who	Dr. Tyler/Gebek/Dr. Carter	12 episodes
1973	Warship	Lieutenant Commander Junnion	3 episodes
1979	A Nightingale Sang in Berkeley Square	Kersey	
1981–1984	Yes Minister	Crawford/Civil Servant	2 episodes
1983–1986	Only Fools and Horses	Harry the Foreman/Vicar	2 episodes
1987	Superman IV: The Quest for Peace	Subway Engineer	
