= Doctor Who: The Fourth Doctor Adventures =

Audio drama

The Fourth Doctor Adventures

Big Finish Productions audio drama
- Series: Doctor Who
- Featuring: Fourth Doctor; Leela; Romana I; Romana II; Anya Kingdom; Adric; K9
- Written by: various
- Directed by: Nicholas Briggs; Ken Bentley; Jamie Anderson
- Music: Howard Carter
- Release date: January 2012

In 2012, Big Finish Productions began producing audio dramas featuring Doctor Who's fourth Doctor, as portrayed by Tom Baker. Baker had previously declined to feature in any Big Finish releases, but after recording a trilogy of full cast audio boxsets for BBC Audiobooks, he decided to participate. This was also part of a spin off series of the Monthly range.

== Cast and characters ==
=== Cast ===
List indicator

This section includes characters who will appear or have appeared in at least one season.

- A green cell indicates the actor is a main cast member.
- A red cell indicates the actor is a recurring cast member.
- A light blue cell indicates the actor is a guest or special guest cast member.

| Actor | Character | Appearances | | | | | | | | | | | | | | | | | | |
| Actor | Character | S1 | Sp. | S2 | S3 | S4 | S5 | S6 | S7 | S8 | S9 | Sp. | S10 | Sp. | S11 | S12 | S13 | Sp. | S14 | S15 |
|---|---|---|---|---|---|---|---|---|---|---|---|---|---|---|---|---|---|---|---|---|
| Tom Baker | The Doctor | ✓ | ✓ | ✓ | ✓ | ✓ | ✓ | ✓ | ✓ | ✓ | ✓ | ✓ | ✓ | ✓ | ✓ | ✓ | ✓ | ✓ | ✓ | ✓ |
| Louise Jameson | Leela | ✓ | ✓ | | ✓ | ✓ | | | ✓ | | | ✓ | ✓ | ✓ | | ✓ | | | ✓ | |
| Mary Tamm | Romana I | | | ✓ | | | | | | | | | | | | | | | | |
| Lalla Ward | Romana II | | | | | | ✓ | ✓ | | | ✓ | | | | | | | | | |
| Jane Slavin | Ann Kelso/Anya Kingdom | | | | | | | | | ✓ | | | | ✓ | | | | | | |
| Jane Slavin | The Laan | | | ✓ | | | ✓ | | | | | | | | | | | | | |
| Matthew Waterhouse | Adric | | | | | | | | | | ✓ | | | | | | | | | |
| Nerys Hughes | Margaret | | | | | | | | | | | | | | ✓ | ✓ | | | | |
| John Leeson | K-9 | | | ✓ | | ✓ | ✓ | ✓ | ✓ | ✓ | ✓ | ✓ | | ✓ | | | | | ✓ | |
| Christopher Naylor | Harry Sullivan | | | | | | | | | | | | | | | | ✓ | ✓ | | ✓ |
| Eleanor Crooks | Naomi Cross | | | | | | | | | | | | | | | | ✓ | | | |
| Sadie Miller | Sarah Jane Smith | | | | | | | | | | | | | | | | | ✓ | | ✓ |
| Jon Culshaw | Brigadier Lethbridge-Stewart | | | | | | | | | | | | | | | | | | ✓ | ✓ |
| Nicholas Briggs | Daleks | ✓ | | ✓ | | | | | | | | | | ✓ | | | | | | |
| Nicholas Briggs | Zygons | | | | ✓ | | | | | | | | | | | | | | | |
| Nicholas Briggs | Cybermen | | | | | ✓ | | | | | | | | | | | | | | |
| Nicholas Briggs | Ice Warriors | | | | | | | | | | | | | | | ✓ | | | | |
| Nicholas Briggs | Sea Devils | | | | | | | | | | | | | | | | ✓ | | | |
| Geoffrey Beevers | The Master | ✓ | | | ✓ | ✓ | | | | | | | | | | | ✓ | | | |
| James Dreyfus | The Master | | | | | | | | | | | | | | ✓ | | | | | |
| Christopher Benjamin | Henry Gordon Jago | | | ✓ | | | | ✓ | | | | | | | | | | | | |
| Trevor Baxter | Professor George Litefoot | | | ✓ | | | | ✓ | | | | | | | | | | | | |
| Dan Starkey | Sontarans | | | | ✓ | | | ✓ | | | | | | | | | | | | |

=== Notable Guests ===
- David Warner as Cuthbert
- David Sibley as The Eminence
- Frazer Hines as Jamie McCrimmon
- David Troughton as The Black Guardian
- Gabriel Woolf as Sutekh
- Joe Sims as Mark Seven
- Siân Phillips as The Director
- John Heffernan as The Nine
- Annette Badland as The Toymaker
- Tamzin Outhwaite as Joan Stone <>
- Rosalie Craig as Lady Anita <>
- Rosie Day as Betty <>

== Episodes ==
=== Season 1 (2012) ===
This series of adventures is set between seasons 14 and 15 of the classic series, and features Louise Jameson reprising her role as Leela.

| No. | Title | Directed by | Written by | Featuring | Released |
|---|---|---|---|---|---|
| 1 | "Destination: Nerva" | Nicholas Briggs | Nicholas Briggs | Fourth Doctor, Leela | January 2012 |
| 2 | "The Renaissance Man" | Ken Bentley | Justin Richards | Fourth Doctor, Leela | February 2012 |
| 3 | "The Wrath of the Iceni" | Ken Bentley | John Dorney | Fourth Doctor, Leela | March 2012 |
| 4 | "Energy of the Daleks" | Nicholas Briggs | Nicholas Briggs | Fourth Doctor, Leela, Daleks | April 2012 |
| 5 | "Trail of the White Worm (Part 1)" | Ken Bentley | Alan Barnes | Fourth Doctor, Leela, the Master | May 2012 |
| 6 | "The Oseidon Adventure (Part 2)" | Ken Bentley | Alan Barnes | Fourth Doctor, Leela, the Master, Kraals | June 2012 |

=== Special (2012) ===
| No. | Title | Directed by | Written by | Featuring | Released |
|---|---|---|---|---|---|
| – | "Night of the Stormcrow" | Nicholas Briggs | Marc Platt | Fourth Doctor, Leela | December 2012 |

=== Season 2 (2013) ===
This series of adventures is set between seasons 16 and 17 of the classic series, and features Mary Tamm and John Leeson reprising their roles as Romana and K9; this was Tamm's final role, as she died in 2012 after recording her parts.

| No. | Title | Directed by | Written by | Featuring | Released |
|---|---|---|---|---|---|
| 1 | "The Auntie Matter" | Ken Bentley | Jonathan Morris | Fourth Doctor, Romana I, K9 | January 2013 |
| 2 | "The Sands of Life (Part 1)" | Nicholas Briggs | Nicholas Briggs | Fourth Doctor, Romana I, K9, Laan, Cuthbert | February 2013 |
| 3 | "War Against the Laan (Part 2)" | Nicholas Briggs | Nicholas Briggs | Fourth Doctor, Romana I, K9, Laan, Cuthbert | March 2013 |
| 4 | "The Justice of Jalxar" | Ken Bentley | John Dorney | Fourth Doctor, Romana I, Jago, Litefoot | March 2013 |
| 5 | "Phantoms of the Deep" | Ken Bentley | Jonathan Morris | Fourth Doctor, Romana I, K9 | May 2013 |
| 6 | "The Dalek Contract (Part 1)" | Nicholas Briggs | Nicholas Briggs | Fourth Doctor, Romana I, K9, Daleks, Cuthbert | June 2013 |
| 7 | "The Final Phase (Part 2)" | Nicholas Briggs | Nicholas Briggs | Fourth Doctor, Romana I, K9, Daleks, Cuthbert | July 2013 |

=== Season 3 (2014) ===
This series of adventures, like Season 1, is set between seasons 14 and 15 of the classic series and features Jameson reprising her role as Leela. Chronologically, it takes place after The Oseidon Adventure and the special Night of the Stormcrow.

| No. | Title | Directed by | Written by | Featuring | Released |
|---|---|---|---|---|---|
| 1 | "The King of Sontar" | Nicholas Briggs | John Dorney | Fourth Doctor, Leela, Sontarans | January 2014 |
| 2 | "White Ghosts" | Nicholas Briggs | Alan Barnes | Fourth Doctor, Leela | February 2014 |
| 3 | "The Crooked Man" | Nicholas Briggs | John Dorney | Fourth Doctor, Leela | March 2014 |
| 4 | "The Evil One" | Nicholas Briggs | Nicholas Briggs | Fourth Doctor, Leela, the Master | April 2014 |
| 5 | "Last of the Colophon" | Nicholas Briggs | Jonathan Morris | Fourth Doctor, Leela | May 2014 |
| 6 | "Destroy the Infinite" | Nicholas Briggs | Nicholas Briggs | Fourth Doctor, Leela, the Eminence | June 2014 |
| 7 | "The Abandoned" | Ken Bentley | Louise Jameson; Nigel Fairs | Fourth Doctor, Leela | July 2014 |
| 8 | "Zygon Hunt" | Nicholas Briggs | Nicholas Briggs | Fourth Doctor, Leela, Zygons | August 2014 |

=== Season 4 (2015) ===
A fourth series of adventures featuring Leela was released, this time also starring John Leeson as K9 and set during season 15 of the classic series.

| No. | Title | Directed by | Written by | Featuring | Released |
|---|---|---|---|---|---|
| 1 | "The Exxilons" | Nicholas Briggs | Nicholas Briggs | Fourth Doctor, Leela, K9, Exxilons | January 2015 |
| 2 | "The Darkness of Glass" | Nicholas Briggs | Justin Richards | Fourth Doctor, Leela | February 2015 |
| 3 | "Requiem for the Rocket Men (Part 1)" | Nicholas Briggs | John Dorney | Fourth Doctor, Leela, K9, the Master, the Rocket Men | March 2015 |
| 4 | "Death Match (Part 2)" | Nicholas Briggs | Matt Fitton | Fourth Doctor, Leela, K9, the Master | April 2015 |
| 5 | "Suburban Hell" | Nicholas Briggs | Alan Barnes | Fourth Doctor, Leela | May 2015 |
| 6 | "The Cloisters of Terror" | Nicholas Briggs | Jonathan Morris | Fourth Doctor, Leela | June 2015 |
| 7 | "The Fate of Krelos (Part 1)" | Nicholas Briggs | Nicholas Briggs | Fourth Doctor, Leela, K9 | July 2015 |
| 8 | "Return to Telos (Part 2)" | Nicholas Briggs | Nicholas Briggs | Fourth Doctor, Leela, K9, Cybermen, Jamie McCrimmon | August 2015 |

=== Season 5 (2016) ===
A fifth series of adventures was released from January 2016, this time featuring Lalla Ward as the second incarnation of Romana and John Leeson as K9. The stories are set between seasons 17 and 18 of the classic series.

| No. | Title | Directed by | Written by | Featuring | Released |
|---|---|---|---|---|---|
| 1 | "Wave of Destruction" | Nicholas Briggs | Justin Richards | Fourth Doctor, Romana II, K9 | January 2016 |
| 2 | "The Labyrinth of Buda Castle" | Nicholas Briggs | Eddie Robson | Fourth Doctor, Romana II | February 2016 |
| 3 | "The Paradox Planet (Part 1)" | Nicholas Briggs | Jonathan Morris | Fourth Doctor, Romana II, K9 | March 2016 |
| 4 | "Legacy of Death (Part 2)" | Ken Bentley | Jonathan Morris | Fourth Doctor, Romana II, K9 | April 2016 |
| 5 | "Gallery of Ghouls" | Ken Bentley | Alan Barnes | Fourth Doctor, Romana II | May 2016 |
| 6 | "The Trouble with Drax" | Nicholas Briggs | John Dorney | Fourth Doctor, Romana II, K9, Drax | June 2016 |
| 7 | "The Pursuit of History (Part 1)" | Nicholas Briggs | Nicholas Briggs | Fourth Doctor, Romana II, K9, the Black Guardian, Cuthbert, Laan | July 2016 |
| 8 | "Casualties of Time (Part 2)" | Nicholas Briggs | Nicholas Briggs | Fourth Doctor, Romana II, K9, the Black Guardian, Cuthbert, Laan | August 2016 |

=== Season 6 (2017) ===
A sixth series was released beginning in January 2017, also featuring Lalla Ward as the second incarnation of Romana and John Leeson as K9. The stories are set during season 18 of the classic series, prior to that season's E-Space trilogy.

| No. | Title | Directed by | Written by | Featuring | Released |
|---|---|---|---|---|---|
| 1 | "The Beast of Kravenos" | Nicholas Briggs | Justin Richards | Fourth Doctor, Romana II, K9, Jago & Litefoot | January 2017 |
| 2 | "The Eternal Battle" | Nicholas Briggs | Cavan Scott and Mark Wright | Fourth Doctor, Romana II, K9, Sontarans | February 2017 |
| 3 | "The Silent Scream" | Nicholas Briggs | James Goss | Fourth Doctor, Romana II, K9, Celluloids | March 2017 |
| 4 | "Dethras" | Nicholas Briggs | Adrian Poynton | Fourth Doctor, Romana II, Flague | April 2017 |
| 5 | "The Haunting of Malkin Place" | Nicholas Briggs | Phil Mulryne | Fourth Doctor, Romana II | May 2017 |
| 6 | "Subterranea" | Nicholas Briggs | Jonathan Morris | Fourth Doctor, Romana II, the Silex | June 2017 |
| 7 | "The Movellan Grave" | Nicholas Briggs | Andrew Smith | Fourth Doctor, Romana II, K9, Movellans | July 2017 |
| 8 | "The Skin of the Sleek (Part 1)" | Ken Bentley | Marc Platt | Fourth Doctor, Romana II, K9 | August 2017 |
| 9 | "The Thief Who Stole Time (Part 2)" | Ken Bentley | Marc Platt | Fourth Doctor, Romana II, K9 | September 2017 |

=== Season 7 (2018) ===
A seventh series was released from January 2018, featuring Louise Jameson as Leela and John Leeson as K9. The stories are set after Season 4, during season 15 of the classic series. This is the first season to be released in 2 separate box sets rather than a new release every month. The final two stories feature Sutekh, a character based upon the Egyptian deity of the same name. Gabriel Woolf reprises his portrayal of Sutekh; Woolf had appeared as the character in the classic Doctor Who serial "Pyramids Of Mars".

| No. | Title | Directed by | Written by | Featuring | Released |
|---|---|---|---|---|---|
| 1 | "The Sons of Kaldor" | Nicholas Briggs | Andrew Smith | Fourth Doctor, Leela, Voc Robots | January 2018 |
| 2 | "The Crowmarsh Experiment" | Nicholas Briggs | David Llewellyn | Fourth Doctor, Leela | January 2018 |
| 3 | "The Mind Runners (Part 1)" | Nicholas Briggs | John Dorney | Fourth Doctor, Leela, K9 | January 2018 |
| 4 | "The Demon Rises (Part 2)" | Nicholas Briggs | John Dorney | Fourth Doctor, Leela, K9 | January 2018 |
| 5 | "The Shadow of London" | Nicholas Briggs | Justin Richards | Fourth Doctor, Leela | May 2018 |
| 6 | "The Bad Penny" | Nicholas Briggs | Dan Starkey | Fourth Doctor, Leela, the Haodean | May 2018 |
| 7 | "Kill the Doctor! (Part 1)" | Nicholas Briggs | Guy Adams | Fourth Doctor, Leela, Sutekh | May 2018 |
| 8 | "The Age of Sutekh (Part 2)" | Nicholas Briggs | Guy Adams | Fourth Doctor, Leela, Sutekh | May 2018 |

=== Season 8 (2019) ===
An eighth series was released from January 2019, featuring John Leeson as K9 and a new companion WPC Ann Kelso played by Jane Slavin. The stories are set in between series 15 and 16 and are collectively titled The Syndicate Master Plan.

| No. | Title | Directed by | Written by | Featuring | Released |
|---|---|---|---|---|---|
| 1 | "The Sinestran Kill" | Nicholas Briggs | Andrew Smith | Fourth Doctor, Ann, Sinestrans | January 2019 |
| 2 | "Planet of the Drashigs" | Nicholas Briggs | Phil Mulryne | Fourth Doctor, Ann, Drashigs | January 2019 |
| 3 | "The Enchantress of Numbers" | Nicholas Briggs | Simon Barnard and Paul Morris | Fourth Doctor, Ann, K9, Ada Lovelace, Lord Byron | January 2019 |
| 4 | "The False Guardian (Part 1)" | Nicholas Briggs | Guy Adams | Fourth Doctor, Ann, K9, Mavic Chen | January 2019 |
| 5 | "Time's Assassin (Part 2)" | Nicholas Briggs | Guy Adams | Fourth Doctor, Ann, K9 | February 2019 |
| 6 | "Fever Island" | Nicholas Briggs | Jonathan Barnes | Fourth Doctor, Ann, K9, Jason Vane | February 2019 |
| 7 | "The Perfect Prisoners (Part 1)" | Nicholas Briggs | John Dorney | Fourth Doctor, Ann, K9 | February 2019 |
| 8 | "The Perfect Prisoners (Part 2)" | Nicholas Briggs | John Dorney | Fourth Doctor, Ann, K9 | February 2019 |

=== Season 9 (2020) ===
A ninth series was released from January 2020, featuring Lalla Ward as Romana II, John Leeson as K9 and Matthew Waterhouse as Adric. The stories are set in Season 18 during the E-Space Trilogy, specifically set between the stories State of Decay and Warriors' Gate. The format of the series changed from two box sets of four one hour stories, to two box sets of two two hour stories. A special, featuring Louise Jameson as Leela and John Leeson as K9 was released in May 2020, which is set between the stories Underworld and The Invasion of Time.

| No. | Title | Directed by | Written by | Featuring | Released |
|---|---|---|---|---|---|
| 1 | "Purgatory 12" | Nicholas Briggs | Marc Platt | Fourth Doctor, Romana II, Adric, K9 | January 2020 |
| 2 | "Chase the Night" | Nicholas Briggs | Jonathan Morris | Fourth Doctor, Romana II, Adric, K9 | January 2020 |
| 3 | "The Planet of Witches" | Ken Bentley | Alan Barnes | Fourth Doctor, Romana II, Adric, K9 | February 2020 |
| 4 | "The Quest of the Engineer" | Nicholas Briggs | Andrew Smith | Fourth Doctor, Romana II, Adric, K9 | February 2020 |

=== Special (2020) ===
| No. | Title | Directed by | Written by | Featuring | Released |
|---|---|---|---|---|---|
| – | "Shadow of the Sun" | Nicholas Briggs | Robert Valentine | Fourth Doctor, Leela, K9 | May 2020 |

=== Season 10 (2021) ===
A tenth series was released from January 2021, featuring Louise Jameson as Leela. Like Series 1 and 3, the stories are set between seasons 14 and 15 of the classic series.

| No. | Title | Directed by | Written by | Featuring | Released |
|---|---|---|---|---|---|
| 1 | "The World Traders" | Nicholas Briggs | Guy Adams | Fourth Doctor, Leela, Usurians | January 2021 |
| 2 | "The Day of the Comet" | Nicholas Briggs | Jonathan Morris | Fourth Doctor, Leela | January 2021 |
| 3 | "The Tribulations of Thadeus Nook" | Nicholas Briggs | Andrew Smith | Fourth Doctor, Leela | February 2021 |
| 4 | "The Primeval Design" | Nicholas Briggs | Helen Goldwyn | Fourth Doctor, Leela, Mary Anning | February 2021 |

=== Dalek Universe: Prologue (2021) ===
A prologue to the Tenth Doctor event Dalek Universe.

| No. | Title | Directed by | Written by | Featuring | Released |
|---|---|---|---|---|---|
| – | "The Dalek Protocol" | Nicholas Briggs | Nicholas Briggs | Fourth Doctor, Leela, K9, Anya Kingdom, Mark Seven, Daleks, Exxilons, Bellal | April 2021 |

=== Season 11 (2022) ===
An eleventh series was released from January 2022, featuring the first appearance of Nerys Hughes as new companion Margaret. The stories will be set during season 14 of the classic series, specifically between The Deadly Assassin and The Face of Evil.

| No. | Title | Directed by | Written by | Featuring | Released |
|---|---|---|---|---|---|
Volume 1: Solo
| 1 | "Blood of the Time Lords" | Nicholas Briggs | Timothy X Atack | Fourth Doctor, The Master | March 2022 |
| 2 | "The Ravencliff Witch" | Nicholas Briggs | David Llewellyn | Fourth Doctor, Margaret | March 2022 |
Volume 2: The Nine
| 3 | "The Dreams of Avarice" | Nicholas Briggs | Guy Adams | Fourth Doctor, The Nine | June 2022 |
| 4 | "Shellshock" | Nicholas Briggs | Simon Barnard and Paul Morris | Fourth Doctor | June 2022 |
| 5 | "Peake Season" | Jamie Anderson | Lizbeth Myles | Fourth Doctor, Mervyn Peake | June 2022 |

=== Season 12 (2023) ===
A twelfth series was released from January 2023, featuring Louise Jameson as Leela and the return of Nerys Hughes as Margaret.

| No. | Title | Directed by | Written by | Featuring | Released |
|---|---|---|---|---|---|
Volume 1: New Frontiers
| 1 | "Ice Heist!" | Nicholas Briggs | Guy Adams | Fourth Doctor, Leela, Margaret, The Ice Warriors | March 2023 |
| 2 | "Antillia the Lost" | Nicholas Briggs | Phil Mulryne | Fourth Doctor, Leela, Margaret | March 2023 |
Volume 2: Angels and Demons
| 3 | "The Wizard of Time" | Nicholas Briggs | Roy Gill | Fourth Doctor, Leela, Margaret | June 2023 |
| 4 | "The Friendly Invasion" | Nicholas Briggs | Chris Chapman | Fourth Doctor, Leela, Margaret | June 2023 |
| 5 | "Stone Cold" | Nicholas Briggs | Roland Moore | Fourth Doctor, Leela, Margaret, Weeping Angels | June 2023 |
| 6 | "The Ghost of Margaret" | Nicholas Briggs | Tim Foley | Fourth Doctor, Leela, Margaret | June 2023 |

=== Season 13 (2024) ===
A thirteenth series was released from March 2024 in three volumes, featuring Christopher Naylor as Harry Sullivan and Eleanor Crooks as Naomi Cross. It will be connected with UNIT: Nemesis.

| No. | Title | Directed by | Written by | Featuring | Released |
|---|---|---|---|---|---|
Volume 1: Storm of the Sea Devils
| 1 | "The Storm of the Sea Devils" | Nicholas Briggs | David K Barnes | Fourth Doctor, Harry Sullivan, Naomi Cross, UNIT, Sea Devils | March 2024 |
| 2 | "Worlds Beyond" | Nicholas Briggs | Robert Khan and Tom Salinsky | Fourth Doctor, Harry, Naomi, Alan Turing | March 2024 |
Volume 2: Metamorphosis
| 3 | "Matryoshka" | Helen Goldwyn | Aurora Fearnley | Fourth Doctor, Harry, Naomi, The Toymaker | June 2024 |
| 4 | "The Caged Assassin" | Nicholas Briggs | Matthew Sweet | Fourth Doctor, Harry, Naomi | June 2024 |
| 5 | "Metamorphosis" | Jamie Anderson | Lisa McMullin | Fourth Doctor, Harry, Naomi, The Master | June 2024 |
Volume 3: Dominant Species
| 6 | "The Face in the Storm" | Nicholas Briggs | Sarah Grochala | Fourth Doctor, Harry, Naomi, Dominators, Quarks | September 2024 |
| 7 | "Dominant Species" | Nicholas Briggs | John Dorney | Fourth Doctor, Harry, Naomi, Dominators, Quarks | September 2024 |

=== Special (2024) ===
A Special Release celebrating Fifty years since the Fourth Doctor's debut. Set between Revenge of the Cybermen and Terror of the Zygons, and a sequel to The Sontaran Experiment.

| No. | Title | Directed by | Written by | Featuring | Released |
|---|---|---|---|---|---|
| – | "The Curse of Time" | Helen Goldwyn | Jonathan Morris | Fourth Doctor, Sarah Jane Smith, Harry Sullivan | December 2024 |

=== Season 14 (2025) ===
Big Finish scheduled three box sets for release for March, June, and September 2025, respectively. Senior Producer John Ainsworth said: “Long-term listeners will know that we record Tom Baker's Fourth Doctor Adventures well in advance, but there might be some surprises on the way.

| No. | Title | Directed by | Written by | Featuring | Released |
|---|---|---|---|---|---|
Volume 1: The Hellwood Inheritance
| 1 | "The Hellwood Inheritance" | Jamie Anderson | Alan Barnes | Fourth Doctor, Leela | March 2025 |
| 2 | "The Memory Thieves" | Jamie Anderson | Phil Mulryne | Fourth Doctor, Leela | March 2025 |
Volume 2: The Ruins of Kaerula
| 3 | "The Remains of Kaerula" | Jamie Anderson and Ken Bentley | Phil Mulryne | Fourth Doctor, Leela, K9 | June 2025 |
| 4 | "The Ruins of Kaerula" | Helen Goldwyn | Phil Mulryne | Fourth Doctor, Leela, K9 | June 2025 |
| 5 | "Cry of the Banshee" | Nicholas Briggs | Tim Foley | Fourth Doctor, Leela, K9, The Brigadier | June 2025 |
Volume 3: The Last Queen of the Nile
| 6 | "Conspiracy of Silence" | Nicholas Briggs | Jonathan Morris | Fourth Doctor, Leela, The Brigadier, The Silence | September 2025 |
| 7 | "The Last Queen of the Nile" | Nicholas Briggs | David K. Barnes | Fourth Doctor, Leela, K9, Mark Antony, Cleopatra | September 2025 |

=== Season 15 (2026) ===
The fifteenth series was released in March, June, and September 2026, featuring Sadie Miller as Sarah Jane Smith.

| No. | Title | Directed by | Written by | Featuring | Released |
|---|---|---|---|---|---|
Volume 1: The Ministry of Death
| 1 | "The Ministry of Death" | Jamie Anderson and Ken Bentley | Robert Valentine | Fourth Doctor, Sarah Jane, The Brigadier | March 2026 |
| 2 | "The Inhuman Empire" | Jamie Anderson and Ken Bentley | Phil Mulryne | Fourth Doctor, Sarah Jane, Harry Sullivan | March 2026 |
Volume 2: Lethal Progress
| 3 | "Green and Pleasant Planet" | Helen Goldwyn | Tim Foley | Fourth Doctor, Sarah Jane | June 2026 |
| 4 | "The Continuum" | Helen Goldwyn | John Dorney | Fourth Doctor, Sarah Jane | June 2026 |
| 5 | "The Audience" | Helen Goldwyn | Lizzie Hopley | Fourth Doctor, Sarah Jane | June 2026 |
Volume 3: A New Occupation
| 6 | "Daughter of Destruction" | Helen Goldwyn | Katharine Armitage | Fourth Doctor, Sarah Jane | September 2026 |
| 7 | "A New Occupation" | Helen Goldwyn | Helen Goldwyn | Fourth Doctor, Sarah Jane, Harry Sullivan | September 2026 |

== Awards and nominations ==
Name of the award ceremony, year presented, category, nominee(s) of the award, and the result of the nomination
| Award ceremony | Year | Category | Work(s) | Result | Ref. |
|---|---|---|---|---|---|
| Scribe Awards | 2023 | Best Audio | Peake Season | Nominated | |
