= Image of the Fendahl =

094 – Image of the Fendahl
- Doctor Who serial

Cast
- Doctor: Tom Baker – Fourth Doctor
- Companion: Louise Jameson – Leela
- Others: Denis Lill – Dr. Fendelman; Scott Fredericks – Max Stael; Wanda Ventham – Thea Ransome; Edward Arthur – Adam Colby; Daphne Heard – Martha Tyler; Geoffrey Hinsliff – Jack Tyler; Edward Evans – Ted Moss; Derek Martin – David Mitchell; Graham Simpson – Hiker

Production
- Directed by: George Spenton-Foster
- Written by: Chris Boucher
- Script editor: Robert Holmes
- Produced by: Graham Williams
- Executive producer: None
- Music by: Dudley Simpson
- Production code: 4X
- Series: Season 15
- Running time: 4 episodes, 25 minutes each
- First broadcast: 29 October – 19 November 1977

Chronology
| ← Preceded by The Invisible Enemy | Followed by → The Sun Makers |

Image of the Fendahl is the third serial of the 15th season of the British science fiction television series Doctor Who, which was first broadcast in four weekly parts on BBC1 from 29 October to 19 November 1977.

The serial was Chris Boucher's third and final script for the series and is set in an English priory, where the cultist Max Stael (Scott Fredericks) prepares the scientist Thea Ransome (Wanda Ventham) to be possessed and transformed by an ancient gestalt alien called a Fendahl.

== Plot ==
In a priory near the village of Fetchborough, four scientists, Adam Colby, Max Stael, Thea Ransome and Dr. Fendelman, are doing tests on a human skull they found in Kenya, apparently twelve million years old. The skull pre-dates the known chronology of humans on earth, suggesting that humans did not originate on Earth; this is a major scientific discovery for the team. When Dr. Fendelman starts using a sonic time scan, trying to get an image of the owner of the skull, the skull itself seems to react, locking onto Thea and releasing something in the priory grounds that kills a passing hiker who eventually totally disintegrates.

The scan catches the attention of the Fourth Doctor and Leela when it pulls them down to Earth. They set off to find it before it creates a continuum implosion and destroys the planet. They separate and Leela finds the cottage of Martha ‘Mother’ Tyler, a local modern-day witch gifted with psychic powers. The Doctor ends up narrowly avoiding death at the hands of the creature created by the skull, which then kills the leader of a detachment of guards Fendelman has brought in after the death of the hiker, sealing everyone into the priory.

Mrs Tyler then encounters the creature but survives and is saved from going into psychic shock by the Doctor, who has worked out that the thing is a Fendahleen, a creature from his own planet's mythology, supposedly destroyed when the Fifth Planet broke up. He makes his way into the priory and finds the skull, which tries to kill him. Leela saves him and they go off to the Fifth Planet, only to find that the Time Lords sealed it in a Time Loop, making all proper records invisible even to them.

Thea, meanwhile, has been gradually converted into the new core of the Fendahl, a creature that feeds off life energy and leaves nothing behind. Stael, leader of the local black magic cult, recognises this and believes he can control the Fendahl and use it to dominate the earth. He and his followers capture Colby and kill Fendelman, who, it is revealed, had been influenced, through his genetic line, by the Fendahl to bring about its release. Stael sets up the Sonic Time scanner to power the skull and Thea's final transformation.

The Doctor, Leela, Mrs Tyler and her grandson Jack head for the priory only to find the Fendahl core has formed and is converting the cult members into Fendahleen, to form the required circle of 12 individuals. The Doctor frees Colby; Stael shoots himself. The doctor kills one of the new Fendahleen and sees that they are fatally allergic to salt. The Fendahl core is two short of the twelve it needs to be complete and form a gestalt. The Doctor rigs the scanner to implode and grabs the now dormant skull, leaving with the others only just before the priory is destroyed along with the Fendahl core and the remaining Fendahleen.

The Doctor and Leela leave; they plan to dump the skull near a supernova, thus ending the Fendahl race forever.

== Production ==
Writer Chris Boucher was commissioned to write the story (his third for the series) on 2 May 1977. He delivered the first episode just two days later, the final one being submitted on the 17 June. Boucher had drawn on the 1967 film (rather than the 1958 TV original) Quatermass and the Pit and the 1959 Kurt Vonnegut novel The Sirens of Titan including the discovering of an alien skull linked to occult symbols, alien influence of mankind's evolution and the dormant alien influence being brought to bear in contemporary humanity. He also took inspiration from the work of archaeologist Louis Leakey who had been excavating human remains for many years until his death in 1972. Boucher named Colby's dog Leakey as a tribute to him, although later realised that people would miss the reference and assume the name came because "he pissed all over everything!" Terrance Dicks' subsequent novelisation of the serial in fact gives both reasons for the name. At the initial read through Tom Baker made numerous jokes about the script, picking out all the double entendres and sending it up. This caused Boucher great upset at the time, but had the knock-on effect of him combing through his scripts from there on for any signs of double entendres. Boucher never wrote for the series again, immediately after this becoming script editor on Blake's 7 for four years and as the BBC didn't want anyone working on two shows at the same time. Boucher would write another script concerning an alien gestalt entity, for the 1981 Blake's 7 episode "Rescue".

Producer Graham Williams had worked with director George Spenton-Foster previously on Z-Cars and chose him to direct this serial due to his experience with night filming. Spenton-Foster would direct one more time for the series in the following year's The Ribos Operation. Script editor on the serial was Robert Holmes in his final assignment. During the work he was trailed by incoming editor Anthony Read, who would subsequently take up the role solely for the next story in production order Underworld (the following transmitted story The Sun Makers having been recorded before Image of the Fendahl). Read had been a television producer but was asked by BBC Head of Serials Graeme McDonald to be script editor to which Read refused until he learned it was for Doctor Who. McDonald had read through the scripts for Fendahl and objected to a scene in part four which showed Stael raise a gun to his mouth. This was changed at the order of producer Williams and the gunshot is only heard. Following this serial, the horror elements under Holmes' guidance were considerably toned down at the order of McDonald.

The exterior scenes were shot on the Stargroves estate in Hampshire, which was owned by Mick Jagger. The same location had been used during the filming of Pyramids of Mars. Filming began on Monday 1 August 1977 and continued until the following Thursday. This included two night shoots for the serial on the Tuesday and Wednesday evenings. The first night's filming was disrupted when the generator caught fire. Another generator had to be ordered from London and arrived at 4 am. Filming at the estate had only been agreed on the 26 July – less than a week before filming began, with the instruction (as had been the case with "Pyramids of Mars") that no effects or explosions were to be undertaken given that the property was a Grade II listed building. Two days after filming was completed Tom Baker and Louise Jameson attended the world's first ever Doctor Who convention in London. Following rehearsals, studio recording for the serial began on Saturday 20 August and was completed on 6 September 1977. Jameson regards this as one of her best stories due to it being written by Chris Boucher, who had created Leela. It was, however, during the making of this serial that she decided to leave at the end of the series.

Wanda Ventham, playing Thea, had previously appeared in The Faceless Ones, and would subsequently appear in Time and the Rani, her three appearances each being ten years apart: 1967, 1977 and 1987. Ventham had in fact auditioned for the James Bond film Goldfinger, but lost out to Shirley Eaton and therefore was excited to be painted gold in this serial, as would have been the case in Goldfinger. She also had to wear a dark wig as the human Thea, as Spenton-Foster thought that her natural blonde hair would lose credibility as a scientist. Denis Lill, cast as Fendelman, was the production team's second choice after actor Anthony Bate became unavailable. Lill would subsequently appear in the 1984 story The Awakening and was Ventham's husband in the sitcom Only Fools and Horses. Scott Fredericks had played Boaz in 1972's Day of the Daleks and was later cast by Spenton-Foster in the Blake's 7 episode "Weapon" alongside Graham Simpson who also appears in this story. Derek Martin had appeared a number of times in Doctor Who as an extra, going back to 1965 and subsequently as a stuntman with the HAVOC group, who had taken part in a number of early serials featuring Jon Pertwee as the Doctor. This was his first and only work on the series as an actor. Geoffrey Hinsliff who played Jack would go on to appear in the 1979 story Nightmare of Eden.

== Broadcast and reception ==
| Episode | Title | Run time | Original release date | UK viewers (millions) |
|---|---|---|---|---|
| 1 | "Part One" | 24:38 | 29 October 1977 | 6.7 |
| 2 | "Part Two" | 24:44 | 5 November 1977 | 7.5 |
| 3 | "Part Three" | 24:22 | 12 November 1977 | 7.9 |
| 4 | "Part Four" | 20:32 | 19 November 1977 | 9.1 |

Paul Cornell, Martin Day, and Keith Topping wrote in The Discontinuity Guide (1995) that Image of the Fendahl was "one of the best stabs at outright horror in Doctor Who's history". They said it was "possibly one episode too long... but the verve of the production more than makes up for this." In The Television Companion (1998), David J. Howe and Stephen James Walker felt that the scripts were "a little vague when it comes to certain details about the Fendahleen" and the Fendahl was "something of a disappointment", but they praised the supporting characters, in particular Daphne Heard's performance, who "plays the role to perfection and is largely responsible for conveying the sense of high tension and anticipation in the latter episodes". They considered Image of the Fendahl to be "one of the last truly frightening Doctor Who stories".

Patrick Mulkern of Radio Times awarded it four stars out of five. He considered Chris Boucher's scripts "his strongest for the series" and described the story as "indeed a 'good one', if not quite great, and a highlight of a dodgy season." He praised Baker's performance, saying he was "fully engaged with the drama, providing a pleasing balance of gravitas and flippancy" but noted that Leela was "toned down". He acknowledged that it is "often cited as the last gasp of the horror sub-genre prevalent in earlier seasons" but added that "punches are pulled" and regarded it as "more like a tale of the supernatural" with "atmospheric night filming and an unusually eerie soundscape." Mulkern concluded that it was "a serial that is the sum of its admirable parts" and "one of the least fraught behind the scenes in season 15". DVD Talk's John Sinnott gave Image of the Fendahl three and a half out of five stars, praising the atmosphere but noting that the slow start and "rather convoluted story" held it back from being a classic.

The second episode of this serial attained a 75% score on the Audience Appreciation Index, a record high up to this point.

== Commercial releases ==
=== In print ===
Doctor Who and the Image of the Fendahl
- Author: Terrance Dicks
- Cover artist: John Geary
- Series: Doctor Who book: Target novelisations
- Release number: 34
- Publisher: Target Books
- Publication date: 26 July 1979
- ISBN: 0-426-20077-2

A novelisation of this serial, written by Terrance Dicks, was published by Target Books in May 1979. The book's cover (painted by John Geary) was once voted as the worst in the series by readers of DWB magazine.

=== Home media ===
This story was released on VHS in March 1993 and on DVD on 20 April 2009 (1 September 2009 in North America). This serial was also released as part of the Doctor Who DVD Files in issue 70 on 7 September 2011. In March 2024, the story was released again in an upgraded format for Blu-ray, being included with the other stories from Season 15 in the Doctor Who - The Collection Box Set.

== Critical analysis ==
A book length study of the serial, written by Simon Bucher-Jones, was published as part of The Black Archive series from Obverse Books in 2016.

The serial was covered in volume 27 of the Doctor Who: The Complete History book series, which reprinted Andrew Pixley's Archive features from Doctor Who Magazine and the various Doctor Who Magazine Special Editions, as well as new articles created specifically for the book.
