= The Sun Makers =

095 – The Sun Makers
- Doctor Who serial

Cast
- Doctor: Tom Baker – Fourth Doctor
- Companions: Louise Jameson – Leela; John Leeson (Voice of K9)
- Others: Henry Woolf – The Collector; Richard Leech – Gatherer Hade; Jonina Scott – Marn; Roy Macready – Cordo; David Rowlands – Bisham; William Simons – Mandrel; Adrienne Burgess – Veet; Michael Keating – Goudry; Carole Hopkin – Nurse; Derek Crewe – Synge; Colin McCormack – Commander; Tom Kelly – Guard

Production
- Directed by: Pennant Roberts
- Written by: Robert Holmes
- Script editor: Robert Holmes and Anthony Read (both uncredited)
- Produced by: Graham Williams
- Executive producer: None
- Music by: Dudley Simpson
- Production code: 4W
- Series: Season 15
- Running time: 4 episodes, 25 minutes each
- First broadcast: 26 November – 17 December 1977

Chronology
← Preceded by Image of the Fendahl	Followed by → Underworld

The Sun Makers is the fourth serial of the 15th season of the British science fiction television series Doctor Who, which was first broadcast in four weekly parts on BBC1 from 26 November to 17 December 1977.

The serial is set on Pluto. In the serial, the alien time traveller the Fourth Doctor (Tom Baker) and his travelling companions Leela (Louise Jameson) and K9 (John Leeson) start a revolution among the humans against an alien corporation which has an economic hold over humanity.

== Plot ==
The Fourth Doctor and Leela arrive on the planet Pluto just in time to prevent one of its citizens, Cordo, from committing suicide over his tax bill. The monopolistic energy company on Pluto is using its economic stranglehold to extract ever growing taxes and those who refuse to pay are forced to live in the dark tunnels of the Undercity. The Doctor, Leela and Cordo venture to the Undercity, where they encounter thieves and dropouts led by the brutal Mandrel. Mandrel tells the Doctor that he must use a stolen card to obtain money from a cashpoint or Leela will be killed. When the Doctor tries the stolen card, he trips a security system which floods the cashpoint chamber with noxious gas and he falls unconscious.

When the Doctor awakes, he is in a Correction Centre alongside another detainee, Bisham. The Doctor is released by Gatherer Hade, who wants his movements tracked, believing the Doctor will lead him to the heart of a conspiracy against the Company. Leela, Cordo and K9 attack the Correction Centre and are taken prisoner by the Collector's personal guard.

The Doctor, Cordo, Bisham, and K9 return to the Undercity and persuade the Undercity dwellers to revolt. Their first target is the main control area where the Company engineers PCM, a fear-inducing drug piped into the air supply, which helps keep the population servile.

Leela is presented to the Collector, who orders her steamed to death. The Doctor saves Leela, but the microphones set up to relay her death screams instead broadcast Mandrel warning the Doctor of how little time he has left to rescue her. The Collector is incensed and even more troubled when the revolution starts spreading. Gatherer Hade, investigating reports of citizens going onto the roof to look at the city's sun, is thrown to his death from the top of his Megropolis, and his underling, Marn, joins the revolution.

Leela and the Doctor head for the Collector's Palace, where the Doctor sabotages the computer system. The Collector arrives and is challenged by the Doctor, who discovers that he is a Usurian, a seaweed-like sentient poisonous fungus, from the planet Usurius. The Doctor denounces his operation on Pluto, which had consumed Mars as well after the Earth had become non-viable. Before the Collector can implement a plan to exterminate the population of Pluto with poison gas, Cordo and the lead rebels help the Doctor defeat the remaining members of the Inner Retinue. The Collector checks his computer to find the Doctor's input has resulted in projected bankruptcy, and the shock causes the Collector to revert to his natural state in a compartment at the base of his wheelchair. The Doctor seals him in, and he and Leela depart with K9, leaving Cordo, Mandrel and the others to contemplate recolonising the Earth.

== Production ==
=== Cast notes ===
Michael Keating also appeared in the audio play The Twilight Kingdom as Major Koth and in Year of the Pig as Inspector Chardalot as well as appearing in all fifty-two episodes of the rival BBC science-fiction drama Blake's 7 from 1978 to 1981 for the portrayal of Vila Restal. Louise Jameson stated in the DVD commentary of the story and on the commentary for The Talons of Weng-Chiang that The Sun Makers was her favourite serial. The pamphlet inside the 2011 DVD of this Serial revealed that the writers briefly considered killing off Leela in this story. Leela ultimately was allowed a non death exit, getting together with the Gallifreyan Andred in 1978's The Invasion of Time.

== Outside references ==
Robert Holmes intended the serial to be a satire of his own experiences with the Inland Revenue services. However, much of the political content was toned down by order of producer Graham Williams, who feared it would be controversial among viewers. Many of the letters and numbers used to denote the labyrinth of corridors in the city, for example P45, allude to well-known tax and Governmental forms, and the abbreviation used to refer to the suppressant gas 'PCM' also stands for Per Calendar Month. The actor who played the Collector, Henry Woolf, had deep bushy eyebrows, very reminiscent of the then-Chancellor of the Exchequer, Denis Healey. However, Holmes presented the villains of the piece as working for a private corporation rather than a government.

The director had originally intended that the giant credit cards featured in the story should resemble Barclaycards. This was vetoed by producer Graham Williams who said that it would be free publicity for the bank.

Near the end of Part Two, when prompted by Mandrel for a story, the Doctor begins, "Once upon a time, there were three sisters..." mirroring the same story he started telling Sarah Jane Smith near the end of Part Three of The Android Invasion (1975).

The Doctor refers to Galileo Galilei in passing, saying, "Galileo would have been impressed." When one of the rebels rhetorically asks the Doctor, "What have we got to lose?" he replies, "Only your claims!" This is a playful paraphrase of the famous slogan derived from the last lines of The Communist Manifesto.

K-9 refers to Pluto as "the ninth planet." It was regarded as such at the time the programme was written and broadcast; in 2006, Pluto lost that distinction when it was redefined as a dwarf planet.

In this episode, Leela and the Doctor are identified as "terrorists." In real life, Leela's character was partially based on Palestinian revolutionary Leila Khaled.

== Broadcast and reception ==
Episode	Title	Run time	Original release date	UK viewers (millions)
1	"Part One"	24:59	26 November 1977	8.5
2	"Part Two"	24:57	3 December 1977	9.5
3	"Part Three"	24:57	10 December 1977	8.9
4	"Part Four"	24:57	17 December 1977	8.4

The story was repeated on BBC1 on consecutive Thursdays from 10 – 31 August 1978, achieving viewing figures of 3.2, 6.5, 6.5 and 7.1 million viewers respectively.

The BBC's Audience Research Report recorded a positive reaction from contemporary viewers, who were pleased the story and characters were more realistic, as well as finding the serial entertaining and well-developed. However, a "substantial minority" were less positive, finding it average science fiction and not strange enough. The Report also found that audiences rated the production values and Jameson's performance as Leela highly, while K9 was popular with younger viewers.

Paul Cornell, Martin Day, and Keith Topping wrote of the serial in The Discontinuity Guide (1995), "A clever script is balanced by a straight-forward plot, although the subtlety of some of the jokes will be lost on a younger audience." In The Television Companion (1998), David J. Howe and Stephen James Walker praised the "high level of sophisticated humour" that satirized the tax system. In 2010, Mark Braxton of Radio Times also gave The Sun Makers a positive review, calling it very successful in terms of the writer's objectives and described it as "playful, witty, ingenious". In addition, he praised the performances, design, and music, and only noted minor faults such as the improbability that the Plutonians had never questioned their society. DVD Talk's Ian Jane gave the serial four out of five stars, saying that it "may not rank up there with the best that the series has to offer but it sure is a fun diversion". While he noted the high production values, he felt that the serial's strength was its script and performances. Dave Golder of SFX was less positive, giving The Sun Makers two and a half out of five stars. He wrote, "The satire is rather blunt, and the gags don't make up for a story that's even more about running down corridors than normal. And these ones are really boring corridors (the concept of set-dressing clearly having eluded the designer). Some good performances and an on-form Tom Baker keep it watchable."

== Commercial releases ==
=== In print ===
Doctor Who and the Sunmakers
- Author: Terrance Dicks
- Cover artist: Andrew Skilleter
- Series: Doctor Who book: Target novelisations
- Release number: 60
- Publisher: Target Books
- Publication date: 18 November 1982
- ISBN: 0-426-20059-4

A novelisation of this serial, written by Terrance Dicks, was published by Target Books in November 1982. Dicks chose to tone down the scene in which revolutionaries cheer as they hurl one of their former oppressors from a roof, reducing the apparent horror so that the rebels concerned feel that their actions have gone "a bit too far".

=== Home media ===
This story was released on VHS in July 2001. The Sun Makers was released on region 2 DVD on 1 August 2011. In March 2024, the story was released again in an upgraded format for Blu-ray, being included with the other stories from Season 15 in the Doctor Who - The Collection Box Set.

=== Soundtrack ===
Doctor Who: The Sun Makers

Soundtrack album by Dudley Simpson
- Released: 1 May 2020
- Genre: Soundtrack
- Label: Silva Screen

Doctor Who soundtrack chronology
Doctor Who: Series 12 (2020)	Doctor Who: The Sun Makers (2020)	Doctor Who: The Visitation (2020)

The February 2020 issue of Doctor Who Magazine announced that Dudley Simpson's score for this serial would be released on CD and vinyl. Release date and track listing were announced on 1 May 2020.

==== Track listing ====
All tracks are written by Dudley Simpson, except where noted.

No.	Title	Length
1.	"Doctor Who Opening Title Theme" (Ron Grainer arr. Delia Derbyshire at the BBC Radiophonic Workshop)	0:46
2.	"Death and Taxes"	0:28
3.	"Mahogany"	0:51
4.	"One Thousand Metres"	2:12
5.	"Six Suns"	1:53
6.	"The Others"	1:29
7.	"Subway 13"	0:36
8.	"Subway 13 (Continued)"	1:07
9.	"A Heart as Big as your Mouth"	0:30
10.	"A Little Hop"	0:23
11.	"Jelly Babies"	0:31
12.	"Something in the Air"	0:24
13.	"K9, Bite!"	0:54
14.	"Humbug"	1:25
15.	"The P45 Return Route"	1:08
16.	"The P45 Return Route (Reprise)"	0:55
17.	"Morton's Fork"	1:09
18.	"I’ve Heard That One, Too"	1:05
19.	"The Rebellion Begins"	0:46
20.	"Static Loop"	3:20
21.	"The Steaming"	1:18
22.	"The Steaming Continued"	1:10
23.	"Gentlemen, Good Luck"	0:40
24.	"Nobody Works Today"	2:11
25.	"The Gatherer Excised"	0:43
26.	"Doctor Who Closing Title Theme (53" Version)" (Ron Grainer arr. Delia Derbyshire at the BBC Radiophonic Workshop)	0:55
