= Doctor Who season 15 =

1977–78 season of British sci-fi TV series

Doctor Who
- Season 15
- Cover art of the Blu-ray release for the complete season
- Starring: Tom Baker; Louise Jameson; John Leeson
- No. of stories: 6
- No. of episodes: 26

Release
- Original network: BBC1
- Original release: 3 September 1977 – 11 March 1978

Season chronology
- ← Previous; Season 14 Next → Season 16

The fifteenth season of British science fiction television series Doctor Who began on 3 September 1977 with the serial Horror of Fang Rock, and ended with The Invasion of Time. The fourth series for the Fourth Doctor, new producer Graham Williams became producer for this series (and the two following), while Robert Holmes left script editing for Anthony Read midway through.

== Casting ==
- Tom Baker as the Fourth Doctor
- Louise Jameson as Leela
- John Leeson as Voice of K9

Tom Baker and Louise Jameson continue their roles as the Fourth Doctor and Leela. K9, played by John Leeson, makes his first appearance during the second serial The Invisible Enemy. Louise Jameson makes her final appearance as Leela in The Invasion of Time.

== Serials ==
Graham Williams took over as producer from Philip Hinchcliffe. Robert Holmes was replaced as script editor by Anthony Read, during The Sun Makers. The season took a short transmission break of two weeks over the Christmas 1977 period, between the broadcasts of The Sun Makers and Underworld.

No. story	No. in season	Serial title	Episode titles	Directed by	Written by	Original release date	Prod. code	UK viewers (millions)	AI
92	1	Horror of Fang Rock	"Part One"	Paddy Russell	Terrance Dicks	3 September 1977	4V	6.8	58
92	1	Horror of Fang Rock	"Part Two"	Paddy Russell	Terrance Dicks	10 September 1977	4V	7.1	—
92	1	Horror of Fang Rock	"Part Three"	Paddy Russell	Terrance Dicks	17 September 1977	4V	9.8	60
92	1	Horror of Fang Rock	"Part Four"	Paddy Russell	Terrance Dicks	24 September 1977	4V	9.9	57
The TARDIS lands on the island of Fang Rock, and the Doctor notices that the lighthouse isn't functioning properly, decides to investigate. Arriving at the lighthouse, the Doctor and Leela talk to the keepers Reuben and Vince, and discover the dead body of the third keeper, Ben. A luxury yacht crashes onto Fang Rock. The four survivors are brought to the lighthouse: the bosun Harker; Colonel James Skinsale MP; the owner, Lord Palmerdale; and his secretary Adelaide Lessage. Some time later, Reuben disappears for a time, reappearing a changed man, and Palmerdale and Harker are killed. The Doctor finds Harker's body and then Reuben's – the latter cold. The creature attempts to kills the others in the lighthouse, revealing itself to be a Rutan, whose ship crash-landed in the sea and who is trying to summon its mother ship, planning to turn the strategically-located Earth into a base in their war against the Sontarans. The Doctor and Skinsale retrieve diamonds from Palmerdale's body belt, but the Rutan kills Skinsale. The Doctor then modifies a flare mortar to destroy the alien, and uses the diamonds to focus the lighthouse beam into a high-energy laser, and destroys the Rutan mothership.
93	2	The Invisible Enemy	"Part One"	Derrick Goodwin	Bob Baker and Dave Martin	1 October 1977	4T	8.6	—
93	2	The Invisible Enemy	"Part Two"	Derrick Goodwin	Bob Baker and Dave Martin	8 October 1977	4T	7.3	—
93	2	The Invisible Enemy	"Part Three"	Derrick Goodwin	Bob Baker and Dave Martin	15 October 1977	4T	7.5	—
93	2	The Invisible Enemy	"Part Four"	Derrick Goodwin	Bob Baker and Dave Martin	22 October 1977	4T	8.3	60
A shuttle crew encounters a cloud in space that infects them with an intelligent virus. When the Doctor answers the distress call, he is infected as well.
94	3	Image of the Fendahl	"Part One"	George Spenton-Foster	Chris Boucher	29 October 1977	4X	6.7	—
94	3	Image of the Fendahl	"Part Two"	George Spenton-Foster	Chris Boucher	5 November 1977	4X	7.5	75
94	3	Image of the Fendahl	"Part Three"	George Spenton-Foster	Chris Boucher	12 November 1977	4X	7.9	—
94	3	Image of the Fendahl	"Part Four"	George Spenton-Foster	Chris Boucher	19 November 1977	4X	9.1	61
Scientists investigating an ancient skull unwittingly start to revive the Fendahl, an ancient life-form feared even by the Time Lords.
95	4	The Sun Makers	"Part One"	Pennant Roberts	Robert Holmes	26 November 1977	4W	8.5	—
95	4	The Sun Makers	"Part Two"	Pennant Roberts	Robert Holmes	3 December 1977	4W	9.5	62
95	4	The Sun Makers	"Part Three"	Pennant Roberts	Robert Holmes	10 December 1977	4W	8.9	68
95	4	The Sun Makers	"Part Four"	Pennant Roberts	Robert Holmes	17 December 1977	4W	8.4	59
In the far future, the planet Pluto is habitable, heated by several miniature suns. However, the heat is available only to the ruling classes.
96	5	Underworld	"Part One"	Norman Stewart	Bob Baker and Dave Martin	7 January 1978	4Y	8.9	65
96	5	Underworld	"Part Two"	Norman Stewart	Bob Baker and Dave Martin	14 January 1978	4Y	9.1	—
96	5	Underworld	"Part Three"	Norman Stewart	Bob Baker and Dave Martin	21 January 1978	4Y	8.9	—
96	5	Underworld	"Part Four"	Norman Stewart	Bob Baker and Dave Martin	28 January 1978	4Y	11.7	—
The remnants of the Minyans have an old link to the Time Lords. The Doctor must help them to find the hidden race banks that will save their dying race.
97	6	The Invasion of Time	"Part One"	Gerald Blake	"David Agnew" (Graham Williams and Anthony Read)	4 February 1978	4Z	11.2	56
97	6	The Invasion of Time	"Part Two"	Gerald Blake	"David Agnew" (Graham Williams and Anthony Read)	11 February 1978	4Z	11.4	—
97	6	The Invasion of Time	"Part Three"	Gerald Blake	"David Agnew" (Graham Williams and Anthony Read)	18 February 1978	4Z	9.5	—
97	6	The Invasion of Time	"Part Four"	Gerald Blake	"David Agnew" (Graham Williams and Anthony Read)	25 February 1978	4Z	10.9	—
97	6	The Invasion of Time	"Part Five"	Gerald Blake	"David Agnew" (Graham Williams and Anthony Read)	4 March 1978	4Z	10.3	—
97	6	The Invasion of Time	"Part Six"	Gerald Blake	"David Agnew" (Graham Williams and Anthony Read)	11 March 1978	4Z	9.8	—
The Doctor returns to Gallifrey, having claimed the Presidency. He orders Leela expelled from the Capitol Citadel. However, the Doctor is doing this to prevent a Vardan instigated disaster.

== Production ==
Season fifteen proved to be a difficult transition period. Philip Hinchcliffe's departure coincided with the loss of a number of long-time contributors to the show as Graham Williams took over as Producer. Williams remarked, "I had to try and find some new ones, and that wasn't the least of the problems. Bob Holmes was stuck on Weng-Chiang for ages... all the scripts were coming in late...".

Robert Holmes remained to work on the three stories he had commissioned, while his successor, Anthony Read, trailed him in preparation of taking over the position. Read, an experienced director and producer, had only agreed to the position of Script Editor because he was intrigued by the chance to work on Doctor Who. Holmes completed Horror of Fang Rock and The Invisible Enemy, before leaving due to creative exhaustion. Image of the Fendahl fell to Read, who had to hastily write K-9 into the story when Holmes made him a regular character.

While Tom Baker enjoyed working with John Leeson (the voice of K-9) in rehearsals, he disliked the prop. Holmes recalled, "it used to drive Tom spare, and more often than not, he'd kick it out of frustration." Holmes agreed to write The Sun Makers, and while the story was meant to follow K-9's introduction and establish him as a regular character, scheduling problems—resulting in the shelving of scripts that Fang Rock had to replace—required the story order to change, with Fendahl preceding it.

Baker had found it difficult to accept the violent Leela character since her introduction, contributing to growing tensions between himself and Louise Jameson. According to Jameson, the tension came to a head during the recording of Fang Rock, when she finally confronted Baker over multiple takes of a scene caused by him entering early and cutting her off. Tensions between the two eased over the course of the season.

Read commissioned Bob Baker and Dave Martin to write Underworld, the penultimate story of the season. Right away, the production was hit hard by record inflation, resulting in the design staff working day and night and inventing new techniques and processes to complete the story on time. The final story, The Invasion of Time, proved even more chaotic: with a reduced budget, a complete last-minute re-write by Read and Williams, and a BBC industrial-dispute between the props department and the electricians.

=== Scrapped stories ===
Read approached David Weir, an old co-worker of his, to write the planned finale to the season, Killers of the Dark. This would have had elements of Asian culture, and included a race of cat people with links to Gallifrey; it was determined impossible to shoot within the show's budget, and scrapped two weeks before filming, resulting in The Invasion of Time being hastily produced to serve as the season's finale. Douglas Adams' The Krikkitmen was a proposal submitted to the production office around the time he was working on The Hitchhiker's Guide to the Galaxy radio series. Holmes rejected the script and encouraged Adams to work on The Hitchhiker's Guide and future proposals for Doctor Who, leading to his commission for The Pirate Planet. Adams would later revise the script as part of a pitch in 1980 for a Doctor Who feature film, though plans failed to develop. Ideas from The Krikkitmen were later incorporated into his book Life, the Universe and Everything, the second sequel of The Hitchhiker's Guide to the Galaxy. Another story by Moris Farhi titled The Divided was left unproduced and scrapped, with Farhi later stating he didn't remember what the story was about.

== Broadcast ==
The entire season was broadcast from 3 September 1977 to 11 March 1978, but with a three week break between the fourth and fifth serials from 17 December 1977 to 7 January 1978.

== Home media ==
=== VHS releases ===
Season	Story no.	Serial name	Duration	Release date		
Season	Story no.	Serial name	Duration	UK	Australia	USA / Canada
15	92	Horror of Fang Rock	4 × 25min.	July 1998	November 1998	March 1999
15	93	The Invisible Enemy	4 × 25 min.	September 2002	November 2002	October 2003
15	94	Image of the Fendahl	4 × 25 min.	March 1993	July 1993	June 1996
15	95	The Sun Makers	4 × 25 min.	July 2001	September 2001	February 2002
15	96	Underworld	4 × 25 min.	March 2002	May 2002	May 2003
15	97	The Invasion of Time	6 × 25 min.	March 2000; 2 × VHS	August 2000	August 2000; 2 × VHS

=== DVD and Blu-ray releases ===
All releases are for DVD unless otherwise indicated:

- ^{(B)} indicates a Blu-ray release

Season	Story no.	Serial name	Duration	Release date		
Season	Story no.	Serial name	Duration	R2	R4	R1
15	92	Horror of Fang Rock	4 × 25 min.	17 January 2005	7 April 2005	6 September 2005
15	93	The Invisible Enemy (Note: Only available as part of the K9 Tales box set with the Doctor Who spin-off K-9 and Company in all regions)	4 × 25 min.	16 June 2008	4 September 2008	2 September 2008
15	94	Image of the Fendahl	4 × 25 min.	20 April 2009	4 June 2009	1 September 2009
15	95	The Sun Makers	4 × 25 min.	1 August 2011	1 September 2011	9 August 2011
15	96	Underworld (Note: Only available as part of the Myths and Legends box set in Regions 2 and 4. Only available individually in Region 1.)	4 × 25 min.	29 March 2010	3 June 2010	6 July 2010
15	97	The Invasion of Time (Note: Available individually or in the Bred for War box set in Regions 2 and 4. Only available individually in Region 1.)	6 × 25 min.	5 May 2008	3 July 2008	2 September 2008
15	92–97	Complete Season 15 (Note: Released as Doctor Who: The Collection – Season 15 in Region B. Released as Doctor Who – Tom Baker: Complete Season Four in Region A.)	26 × 25 min.	18 March 2024 ^{(B)}	19 June 2024 ^{(B)}	9 July 2024 ^{(B)}

== In print ==
Season	Story no.	Library no. (Note: Number in Target's Doctor Who Library, if applicable)	Novelisation title	Author	Hardcover release date (Note: Published by Target's parent companies (Allen Wingate, W. H. Allen, BBC Books) unless otherwise indicated)	Paperback release date (Note: Published by Target Books (or by BBC Books under the Target Collection umbrella) unless otherwise indicated)	Audiobook	
Season	Story no.	Library no.	Novelisation title	Author	Hardcover release date	Paperback release date	Release date (Note: Unabridged from BBC Audio / AudioGo unless otherwise indicated)	Narrator
15	092	32	Doctor Who and the Horror of Fang Rock	Terrance Dicks	30 March 1978		2 February 2017	Louise Jameson
15	093	36	Doctor Who and the Invisible Enemy	Terrance Dicks	29 March 1979		2 August 2018	John Leeson
15	094	34	Doctor Who and the Image of the Fendahl	Terrance Dicks	26 July 1979		6 February 2020	Louise Jameson
15	095	60	Doctor Who and the Sunmakers	Terrance Dicks	18 November 1982		7 February 2019	Louise Jameson (Note: K9 voice performed by John Leeson)
15	096	67	Doctor Who and the Underworld	Terrance Dicks	24 January 1980		6 May 2021	Louise Jameson
15	097	35	Doctor Who and the Invasion of Time	Terrance Dicks	21 February 1980		1 September 2016	John Leeson
