= Leela (Doctor Who) =

Fictional character in the TV series Doctor Who

- Doctor Who character
- Leela of the Sevateem
- First appearance: The Face of Evil (1977)
- Last appearance: The Invasion of Time (1978)
- Portrayed by: Louise Jameson
- Non-canonical appearances: Dimensions in Time (1993)
- Duration: 1977–1978, 1993, 2024

In-universe information
- Full name: Leela
- Species: Human
- Occupation: Warrior
- Affiliation: Fourth Doctor; K9
- Family: Sole (father)
- Home: Unspecified
- Home era: Far future

Leela is a fictional character played by Louise Jameson in the long-running British science fiction television series Doctor Who. She was a companion of the Fourth Doctor and a regular in the programme from 1977 to 1978. Leela appeared in nine stories (40 episodes).

== Appearances ==
=== Television ===
Leela was the daughter of Sole. She first appears in the 1977 serial The Face of Evil. She is a warrior of the savage Sevateem tribe, who were amongst the descendants of the crew of an Earth starship from the Mordee Expedition that crash-landed on an unnamed planet in the far future. The tribe's name is a corruption of "survey team". The Doctor at this point was content to travel alone, but Leela barged into the TARDIS and continued to accompany him on his journeys.

Though a noble savage, Leela was highly intelligent, grasping advanced concepts easily and translating them into terms she could cope with. Despite the Doctor's attempts at "civilizing" her, Leela was strong-willed enough to continue in her ways. She usually dressed in animal skins, and was armed with a knife or a set of poisonous Janis thorns, which she did not hesitate to use on people who threatened her, much to the Doctor's disapproval. She often demonstrated a highly accurate sense of danger.

Although the character is direct and fierce, she also demonstrates empathy and compassion in several episodes including not pushing Mother Tyler too hard in Image of the Fendahl, protecting and comforting Toos in The Robots of Death, and comforting in the slave Idas in Underworld, and helping Rodan to safety in The Invasion of Time. She also comments on the Doctor's gentleness in Image of the Fendahl, indicating her value of such a trait in another.

In her travels with the Doctor, Leela faced killer robots (The Robots of Death), murderous homunculi (The Talons of Weng-Chiang), the Rutan Host (Horror of Fang Rock), and the Sontaran invasion of the Doctor's home planet of Gallifrey. During this final adventure, The Invasion of Time, she meets and falls in love with Andred, a native Gallifreyan, and decides to stay behind to be with him. The first K-9 remains with her. This exit for her character was created after Louise Jameson announced her intention to leave the show.

Following her departure, she was mentioned in the series on two subsequent occasions. In Full Circle, when the Doctor believes he has returned to Gallifrey, he admits, "I'm so looking forward to seeing how Leela and Andred are getting on". When he finally does arrive on Gallifrey in Arc of Infinity, he asks after her: "Tell me, what of my former companion Leela?" The Doctor is told she is "well and very happy", to which he responds "I was so sorry to miss her wedding".

=== Other media ===
Jameson reprised the role of Leela onscreen in the 1993 charity special Dimensions in Time.

Leela's life on Gallifrey has been explored in various spin-off media. In the Virgin New Adventures novel Lungbarrow, by Marc Platt, Leela and Andred are expecting a child, the first naturally conceived baby on Gallifrey for millennia. When the Doctor learns this, he asks her to name it after him; Platt explained that this was meant to suggest a time loop in which the hybrid child goes on to become the Other and subsequently the Doctor, explaining his half-human parentage in the 1996 TV film.

Jameson has voiced the character in six series of Big Finish Productions audio plays set on Gallifrey, alongside Lalla Ward as Romana and John Leeson as K-9. In the Gallifrey audio series, Leela acts as Romana's bodyguard, advisor, and friend. Being in the presence of Time Lord biology extends Leela's lifespan and keeps her relatively youthful; if she ever left them, however, then she would quickly age to death. In Gallifrey, Leela and Andred separate after Andred fakes his death to infiltrate the Celestial Intervention Agency (he regenerates and impersonates a man who attempted to kill him, not considering how his actions would affect Leela). Andred is subsequently killed and Leela is blinded during a Gallifreyan civil war, which also results in her version of K9 (the original) being destroyed. She is then taken out of time, to avoid her perishing with the rest of Gallifrey. She follows Romana through several alternative universes, regaining vision in one eye by ingesting vampire blood, her unique physiology allowing her to be physically enhanced by it without experiencing the negative, mental side-effects. She eventually returns to her original universe with Romana in time to save their Gallifrey.

In 2011, Leela joined the cast of the second series of Jago & Litefoot, where she is sent by Romana to investigate breaks in time in Victorian London. In the same year, Jameson reprised the role of Leela alongside Tom Baker as the Fourth Doctor for a series of audio dramas for Big Finish. These dramas began to be released in January 2012, and are adaptations of stories planned for TV but never produced, as well as original storylines set in the gap between The Talons of Weng-Chiang and Horror of Fang Rock. Leela has also appeared in several Past Doctor Adventures, including four novels by Chris Boucher pairing her with the Fourth Doctor, with whom she also appears in Philip Reeve's 2013 short story "The Roots of Evil" (which sees the Fourth Doctor and Leela deal with the aftermath of a situation created by the Eleventh Doctor).

Seemingly surviving the Time War, Leela features in a trilogy of Companion Chronicles audio stories in which she ages a year per day without the Time Lords. In The Catalyst, an elderly Leela is interrogated by a Z'Nai warrior to learn what secrets she may know of a legendary "lost world" (presumably Gallifrey), and tells stories of her past to a child imprisoned in the room. In her final audio, The Time Vampire, she recalls how K9 flew into the Time Vortex and she had a vision of an "ancient" woman. Once her tale is told and she feels ready to die, K9 suddenly appears before her; he frees her, and guides her soul to its next stage.

In 2017, Jameson appeared as Leela alongside John Hurt as the War Doctor, the retroactive 'ninth' Doctor who fought in the Time War, in the War Doctor audio series. In this audio, Leela is stated to have been lost in an early battle in the Time War, but was actually struck by a Disruptor Dalek, intended to erase her from all alternate timelines, only for unspecified factors – hinted to be Leela's strength of will – to draw Leela back to this universe, but now forced to endure the memories of every possible alternate path her life might have taken and no way to determine which one is true. After helping Leela seal a dimensional rift, the War Doctor is able to use the TARDIS to bring Leela's memories back into order.

Later in 2017, Jameson as Leela appeared in the Fifth Doctor audio Time in Office; when the Fifth Doctor is recalled to Gallifrey to take on the role as President to stabilise Gallifrey's tenuous political situation after Borusa's deceptions ("The Five Doctors"), Leela assists his current companion Tegan Jovanka in finding a loophole that allows her to stay on Gallifrey with him, essentially acting as the Doctor's bodyguard and advisor until he returns to his travels.

In 2024, Jameson reprised the role of Leela in the closing moments of the Time War in Leela vs the Time War, an official Doctor Who short film on YouTube announcing Season 15 of Classic Doctor Who as being released on Blu-ray.

== Characterisation ==
=== Conception ===
The character of Leela was first conceived by producer Philip Hinchcliffe and script editor Robert Holmes. They wanted a companion in the mould of George Bernard Shaw's Eliza Doolittle (from Pygmalion): a bright but unsophisticated primitive who would learn from the Doctor. Writer Chris Boucher had submitted a story proposal titled The Mentor Conspiracy which featured a character named Leela, fitting Hinchcliffe's and Holmes's ideas. Boucher named the character after the Palestinian hijacker Leila Khaled. Although The Mentor Conspiracy was not produced, Boucher reused the character of Leela for The Day God Went Mad – later retitled The Face of Evil – seeing her as a mixture of Khaled, and The Avengers' Emma Peel.

Boucher was asked to write two endings to Face, one in which Leela left with the Doctor, and one in which she stayed behind. The decision to have Leela become a companion was made soon after. An oft-repeated story (also stated in the DVD commentary to The Robots of Death) is that Leela's skimpy leather outfits were very popular with the "dads", which kept them watching the programme.

=== Casting ===
According to the official DVD release of the story The Face of Evil in 2012, Louise Jameson won the role of Leela over 26 other hopeful actresses auditioned between 10 and 25 August 1976. Emily Richard was producer Philip Hinchcliffe's first choice, but when she proved unavailable, Celia Foxe, Colette Gleeson, Elaine Donnelly, Gail Grainger, Belinda Sinclair, Ann Pennington, Sally Geeson, Pamela Salem, Carol Leader, Heather Tobias, Marilyn Galsworthy, Katherine Fahey, Deborah Fairfax, Irene Gorst, Kay Korda, Lois Hantz, Belinda Low, Gail Harrison, Michelle Newell, Philippa Vazey, Sue Jones-Davies, Lydia Lisle, Janet Edis, Susan Wooldridge and Carol Drinkwater were all seen for the part. The last five actresses were shortlisted with Louise Jameson and all recalled. Auditions took place in batches of eight actresses, with Jameson amongst the first batch. As Tom Baker was not available for her audition, director Pennant Roberts played the part of the Doctor. Jameson was given the role on 26 August 1976. Despite not being on the final shortlist, Pamela Salem won a small voice role in Leela's debut story, The Face of Evil, followed by a substantial part in the next story The Robots of Death.

Although Jameson's eyes are naturally blue, as Leela she initially wore red contact lenses to make them brown. However, the contact lenses severely limited her vision, and producer Graham Williams promised her she could stop wearing them. To explain the change in-story, writer Terrance Dicks wrote a scene in the 1977 serial Horror of Fang Rock in which Leela's eyes suffer "pigment dispersal" and turn blue after viewing the explosion of the Rutan ship.

Tom Baker disliked Leela's character concept because he felt that she was too violent. Jameson reports that he was cold to her for the first several stories they did together. Eventually, during the filming of Horror of Fang Rock, she insisted on multiple takes of a scene in which he repeatedly entered the scene early, thereby upstaging her. This incident appears to have increased Baker's respect for her, and their working relationship substantially improved thereafter. Aside from feeling that Baker was "competitive", Jameson suffered from glandular fever in the middle of her time on the show and also was allergic to dry ice.

Graham Williams offered to rewrite the end of The Invasion of Time so Leela could stay, but Jameson declined as she was already committed to a play of The Merchant of Venice. Jameson was also invited to return for a whole season when Peter Davison became the Doctor to ease the transition, but she did not wish to participate in a full season.

== List of appearances ==
=== Television ===
Season 14

- The Face of Evil
- The Robots of Death
- The Talons of Weng-Chiang

Season 15

- Horror of Fang Rock
- The Invisible Enemy
- Image of the Fendahl
- The Sun Makers
- Underworld
- The Invasion of Time

30th anniversary special

- Dimensions in Time

=== Audio dramas ===
Doctor Who: The Monthly Adventures

- Zagreus
- Time In Office

Gallifrey

- Series 1
  - Weapon of Choice
  - Square One
  - The Inquiry
  - A Blind Eye
- Series 2
  - Lies
  - Spirit
  - Pandora
  - Insurgency
  - Imperiatrix
- Series 3
  - Fractures
  - Warfare
  - Appropriation
  - Mindbomb
  - Panacea
- Series 4
  - Reborn
  - Disassembled
  - Annihilation
  - Forever
- Series 5
  - Emancipation
  - Evolution
  - Arbitration
- Series 6
  - Extermination
  - Renaissance
  - Ascension
- Enemy Lines
- Time War: Volume One
  - Celestial Intervention
  - The Devil You Know
- Time War: Volume Three
  - Mother Tongue
  - Unity
- Time War: Volume Four
  - Deception
  - Homecoming
- War Room: Volume One
  - The Last Days of Freme
  - The Passenger
  - Collateral Victim
  - The First Days of Phaidon
- War Room: Volume Two
  - Collaborators
  - Remnants
  - Transference
  - Ambition's Debt

Doctor Who: The Companion Chronicles

- The Catalyst
- Empathy Games
- The Time Vampire
- The Child
- Dumb Waiter

Jago & Litefoot

- Series 2
  - The Ruthven Inheritance (cameo)
- Series 3
  - Dead Men's Tales
  - The Man at the End of the Garden
  - Swan Song
  - Chronoclasm
- Series 4
  - Jago in Love
  - Beautiful Things
  - The Lonely Clock
  - The Hourglass Killers
- Series 7
  - The Night of 1000 Stars
- Jago & Litefoot Forever

Doctor Who: The Lost Stories

- The Fourth Doctor Boxset
  - The Foe from the Future
  - The Valley of Death

Doctor Who: The Fourth Doctor Adventures

- Series 1
  - Destination Nerva
  - The Renaissance Man
  - The Wrath of the Iceni
  - Energy of the Daleks
  - Trail of the White Worm
  - The Oseidon Adventure
  - Night of the Stormcrow
- Series 3
  - The King of Sontar
  - The White Ghosts
  - The Crooked Man
  - The Evil One
  - Last of the Colophon
  - Destroy the Infinite
  - The Abandoned
  - Zygon Hunt
- Series 4
  - The Exxilons
  - The Darkness of Glass
  - Requiem for the Rocket Men
  - Death Match
  - Suburban Hell
  - The Cloisters of Terror
  - The Fate of Krelos
  - Return to Telos
- Series 7
  - The Sons of Kaldor
  - The Crowmarsh Experiment
  - The Mind Runners
  - The Demon Rises
  - The Shadow of London
  - The Bad Penny
  - Kill the Doctor!
  - The Age of Sutekh
- Special
  - Shadow of the Sun
- Series 10
  - The World Traders
  - The Day of the Comet
  - The Tribulations of Thadeus Nook
  - The Primeval Design
- Dalek Universe
  - The Dalek Protocol
- Series 12
  - Ice Heist!
  - Antillia the Lost
  - The Wizard of Time
  - The Friendly Invasion
  - Stone Cold

Doctor Who: Special Releases

- The Light at the End
- The Worlds of Doctor Who: Second Sight
- The Eighth of March: Emancipation
- The Legacy of Time: Collision Course
- Classic Doctors, New Monsters: The Tivolian Who Knew Too Much
- The Eighth of March: A Ghost of Alchemy

Doctor Who: Philip Hinchcliffe Presents

- The Ghosts of Gralstead
- The Devil's Armada
- The Genesis Chamber
- The Helm of Awe
- The God of Phantoms

Doctor Who: The War Doctor

- Casualties of War
  - The Lady of Obsidian
  - The Enigma Dimension
- He Who Fights With Monsters
  - The Abyss

Doctor Who: The Fifth Doctor Adventures

- Wicked Sisters
  - The Garden of Storms
  - The Moonrakers
  - The People Made of Smoke

Doctor Who: The Eighth Doctor Adventures

- Ravenous 3
  - Companion Piece (cameo)

Doctor Who: The Tenth Doctor Adventures

- Tenth Doctor, Classic Companions
  - Splinters

Doctor Who: Short Trips

- Death-Dealer
- Sound the Siren And I'll Come To You Comrade
- String Theory
- The Ghost Trap
- Black Dog
- Erasure
- The Revisionists
- The Beast of Muir

=== Novels ===
Virgin New Adventures

- Lungbarrow by Marc Platt

Past Doctor Adventures

- Eye of Heaven by Jim Mortimore
- Last Man Running by Chris Boucher
- Corpse Marker by Chris Boucher
- Psi-ence Fiction by Chris Boucher
- Drift by Simon A. Forward
- Match of the Day by Chris Boucher

=== Short stories ===
- "Crimson Dawn" by Tim Robins (Decalog 2: Lost Property)
- "People of the Trees" by Pam Baddeley (Decalog 2: Lost Property)
- "One Bad Apple" by Simon A. Forward (More Short Trips)
- "The Brain of Socrates" by Gareth Roberts (Short Trips: The Muses)
- "The Destroyers" by Steve Lyons (Short Trips: Life Science)
- "The Bushranger's Story" by Sarah Groenewegen (Short Trips: Repercussions)
- "It's a Lovely Day Tomorrow" by Martin Day (Short Trips: A Christmas Treasury)
- "The Sooner the Better" by Ian Farrington (Short Trips: A Day in the Life)
- "The Prodigal Sun" by Matthew Griffiths (Short Trips: The History of Christmas)
- "The Dogs of War" by Brian Keene (Short Trips: Destination Prague)
- "Dear Great Uncle Peter" by Neil Corry (Short Trips: The Ghosts of Christmas)
- "Stanley" by Lizzie Hopley (Short Trips: Defining Patterns)

=== Comics ===
- "The Orb" by John Canning (Mighty TV Comic 1334-1340)
- "The Mutants" by John Canning (Mighty TV Comic 1341-1347)
- "The Devil's Mouth" by John Canning (Mighty TV Comic 1348-1352)
- "The Aqua-City" by John Canning (TV Comic 1353-1360)
- "The Power" by Paul Crompton (Doctor Who Annual 1979)
- "Emsone's Castle" by Paul Crompton (Doctor Who Annual 1979)
- "Doctor Who and the Fangs of Time" by Sean Longcroft (Doctor Who Magazine 243)
- "Rest and Re-Creation" by Warwick Gray and Charlie Adlard (Doctor Who Magazine Yearbook 1994)

== Legacy ==
Hollyoaks character Leela Lomax was named after Leela from Doctor Who.

Futurama character Turanga Leela also gets her last name from Leela. This was confirmed by co-creator Matt Groening in the show's DVD commentary.

Marathon character Leela was also named after Leela.
