= The Invisible Enemy (Doctor Who) =

093 – The Invisible Enemy
- Doctor Who serial

Cast
- Doctor: Tom Baker – Fourth Doctor
- Companions: Louise Jameson – Leela; John Leeson (Voice of K9)
- Others: Michael Sheard – Lowe; Brian Grellis – Safran; Jay Neill – Silvey; Edmund Pegge – Meeker; Anthony Rowlands – Crewman; Frederick Jaeger – Professor Marius; John Leeson – Nucleus Voice; Roy Herrick – Parsons; Elizabeth Norman, Nell Curran – Nurses; Jim McManus – Ophthalmologist; Roderick Smith – Cruikshank; Kenneth Waller – Hedges; Pat Gorman – A Medic; John Scott Martin – Nucleus

Production
- Directed by: Derrick Goodwin
- Written by: Bob Baker; Dave Martin
- Script editor: Robert Holmes
- Produced by: Graham Williams
- Executive producer: None
- Music by: Dudley Simpson
- Production code: 4T
- Series: Season 15
- Running time: 4 episodes, 25 minutes each
- First broadcast: 1–22 October 1977

Chronology
← Preceded by Horror of Fang Rock	Followed by → Image of the Fendahl

The Invisible Enemy is the second serial of the 15th season of the British science fiction television series Doctor Who, which was first broadcast in four weekly parts on BBC1 from 1 to 22 October 1977. The serial introduced the robot dog K9, voiced by John Leeson. In the serial, an intelligent virus intends to spread across the universe after finding a suitable spawning location on the moon Titan.

== Plot ==
Some human space travellers are cruising near the outer planets of the Solar System with their ship on autopilot. The TARDIS is travelling through the same region. The crews of both ships are infected by a sentient virus, which chooses The Doctor to be the host of its "mind," the Nucleus of the Swarm. The Nucleus declares Leela a reject and orders her killed. The Doctor manages to break free of his infection and tells Leela how to get the TARDIS to the nearest medical centre. At the medical station, the Doctor's doctor, Professor Marius, introduces the group to K9, a robotic dog he made to replace the real dog he had to leave on Earth.

Leela and the Doctor decide to create clones of themselves, which will then be shrunk and inserted into the Doctor. There they will destroy the Nucleus and escape through a tear duct. In the meantime, Leela and K9 fight off the infected staff of the hospital. The plan goes awry, allowing the Nucleus to escape and become human sized. The Nucleus and the infected staff leave for Titan Base so the Nucleus can spawn.

The Doctor realises he is cured since Leela's clone introduced her immunity factor into his bloodstream. He replicates it and gives it to Prof. Marius. The Doctor, Leela, and K9 proceed to Titan Base in the TARDIS.

They fight off the infected humans, but are again without sufficient weaponry to destroy the Nucleus, or its many children, which are about to hatch as "macro-sized" beings, like the newly macro-sized Nucleus. The Doctor jams the door they are behind and rigs a gun to fire into a cloud of oxygen gas he is releasing and escapes. As intended, when the Swarm finally forces open the door, the blaster fires, igniting the oxygen in Titan's methane atmosphere and destroying the Swarm and the base.

When they return to the hospital, they thank Prof. Marius for the use of K9, who has ably assisted them. Prof. Marius offers K9 to the Doctor, as he is due to return to Earth, and the Doctor and Leela leave with their new companion in the TARDIS.

== Production ==
Working titles for this story included The Enemy Within, The Invader Within and The Invisible Invader. It was not decided until late in the production that K9 was to be a new companion. The decision to use it in multiple serials was made partly to offset the expense that had gone into making the prop.

The Invisible Enemy was filmed and recorded in April 1977. In one scene there is an obvious crack in a wall before it is fired at by K9; the crack was originally concealed, but the scene was reshot with little time left to repair the join.

=== Cast notes ===
Michael Sheard (Lowe) makes his fourth of six appearances in Doctor Who, having made previous appearances in The Ark (1966), The Mind of Evil (1971) and Pyramids of Mars (1975). Brian Grellis previously played Sheprah in Revenge of the Cybermen (1975) and would later appear as the Megaphone Man in Snakedance (1983). Frederick Jaeger (Marius) also played Jano in The Savages (1966) and Professor Sorenson in Planet of Evil (1975).

== Broadcast and reception ==
Episode	Title	Run time	Original release date	UK viewers (millions)
1	"Part One"	23:09	1 October 1977	8.6
2	"Part Two"	25:13	8 October 1977	7.3
3	"Part Three"	23:28	15 October 1977	7.5
4	"Part Four"	21:22	22 October 1977	8.3

The story was repeated on BBC1 on consecutive Thursdays from 13 July to 3 August 1978, achieving ratings of 4.9, 5.5, 5.1 and 6.8 million viewers, respectively.

Reviewing the serial for The Times newspaper on the Monday following the second episode's transmission, critic Stanley Reynolds gave the story a generally negative reception. He also pointed out that in ITV regions where the series was competing with Man from Atlantis in the Saturday early-evening slot, it was now losing the ratings war:

In the current story, The Invisible Enemy, now halfway through its four-week run, a malignant virus has struck a space station. Some evil force is attempting to take the station, and undoubtedly the universe, over. When one is being 'taken over' those sort of lightning flashes like the advert for learning how to hypnotise, travel from the eyes of the villain to the one having the fluence put upon him. One then gets rather furry of face and hand, but the appeal of Dr Who has always been the monster and this time out the BBC seems to have lost its touch with monsters... Maybe the leggy Leela is there for the dad and more earthy 14-year-olds, rather like those appalling rhythmic girls who practise dancing each week on Top of the Pops. Of course the return of the Daleks is all Dr Who needs; what the Top of the Pops girls need is something else, but that is neither here nor there.

More recent reviews have also not been positive. Paul Cornell, Martin Day and Keith Topping wrote of the serial in The Discontinuity Guide (1995), "An ambitious project which has the look of a grand folly due to budget constraints and the tongue-in-cheek script... K9 makes a quite impressive debut, though, as with many aspects of The Invisible Enemy, the ideas are better than the realisation." In The Television Companion (1998), David J. Howe and Stephen James Walker called it one of the "weakest" Fourth Doctor stories, mostly consisting of "clichéd and undemanding action-adventure material". They also noted the inconsistent visual effects.

In 2010, Mark Braxton of Radio Times awarded it two stars out of five, contrasting it with the Philip Hinchcliffe era and describing it as "a kidified, Poundland Star Wars". He felt "many of the effects are excellent" but observed a "precarious juxtaposition" between good and bad effects and "the ambition of the serial as a whole". He praised the story as a "romping yarn" which "brings out the best in veteran designer Barry Newbery", but criticised "unbelievably incompetent" action scenes, as well as "harsh lighting" and "pristine white sets". He also commented on Louise Jameson as looking "unsurprisingly ill at ease" despite giving "her usual 100 per cent". DVD Talk's John Sinnott disliked the way K9 was used too conveniently and found the plot too similar to Fantastic Voyage (1966), but less well done. He praised the visual effects of the inside of the Doctor's head, but criticised the other sets.

== Commercial Releases ==
=== In print ===
Doctor Who and the Invisible Enemy
- Author: Terrance Dicks
- Cover artist: Roy Knipe
- Series: Doctor Who book: Target novelisations
- Release number: 36
- Publisher: Target Books
- Publication date: 29 March 1979
- ISBN: 0-426-20054-3

A novelisation of this serial, written by Terrance Dicks, was published by Target Books in March 1979.

=== Home media ===
The story was released on VHS in September 2002. The DVD was released on 16 June 2008 with the spin-off "K-9 and Company" in a double pack called "K9 Tales". This serial was scheduled to be released as part of the Doctor Who DVD Files in issue 133 on 5 February 2014. In March 2024, the story was released again in an upgraded format for Blu-ray, with new special effects, being included with the other stories from Season 15 in the Doctor Who - The Collection Box Set.
