= Jay Neill (actor) =

English actor (1932–2006)

- Born: Joseph Neill; 21 May 1932; London, England
- Died: 14 June 2006 (aged 74); Twickenham, London, England
- Occupation: Actor
- Years active: 1967-1986
- Notable work: The Masque of Mandragora, The Invisible Enemy, Underworld

Jay Neill (21 May 1932 – 14 June 2006) was an English variety performer and television actor who often appeared in comedic roles.

== Biography ==
Born in London, Neill started work as a stagehand at West London's Chiswick Empire theatre before auditioning for a role within the Dior Dancers adagio act. The Dior Dancers went on to achieve considerable success on the international variety circuit in the 1950s appearing in Las Vegas, as well as the Royal Command Performance.

After leaving the Dior Dancers, Neill moved on to a career as a television actor, appearing in television programmes, including Doctor Who, The Onedin Line, Fawlty Towers, Sykes, Terry and June and Upstairs, Downstairs.

Later in life, Neill worked as a chauffeur.

=== Death ===
Neill died in Twickenham, London, in 2006 at the age of 74.

=== Television work ===
==== Doctor Who ====
- The Enemy of the World (1967–1968) ... Guard – uncredited
- Doctor Who and the Silurians (1970) ... Policeman – uncredited
- Colony in Space (1971) ... IMC Security Guard – uncredited
- The Masque of Mandragora (1976) ... Pikeman
- The Invisible Enemy (1977) ... Silvey
- Underworld (1978) ... Guard Klimt

==== Other ====
- Mistress of Hardwick (1972) ... Gentleman
- Grange Hill S4 E14 (1980) ... Child Molester
