= David Agnew (pen name) =

Pseudonym used at the BBC

"David Agnew" is a pen name that was employed on BBC television drama programmes of the 1970s as a scriptwriting credit.

== Conditions of use ==
The pseudonym "David Agnew" was most often used when the original freelance scriptwriter was unable to accommodate fundamental changes requested by the production staff, who therefore had to perform a significant rewrite themselves. BBC rules prevented the production staff from taking screen credit without a time-consuming, bureaucratic appeals process, meaning that the quickest way for the project to continue under the BBC system was to use the name of a non-existent writer. Sometimes production staff were directly ordered by BBC management to use the credit.

== Examples ==
The name was first used in 1971, when Anthony Read's script for the Play for Today episode "Hell's Angel" was broadcast under the pseudonym. Read's work on the 1975 BBC2 Playhouse episode "Diane" was likewise credited to "David Agnew".

The pseudonym entered into use on Doctor Who after Anthony Read became the show's script editor. Read and producer Graham Williams used the pen name hurriedly to assemble The Invasion of Time in 1978. A year later, the name concealed the joint work of Douglas Adams, Williams, and David Fisher on City of Death.

The name was also used for the episode "Blow Out" of Target. In this case, a two-hour script was pared down to one. Writer Roger Marshall quit at the pre-production stage, leaving director Douglas Camfield to revise the script.

== Use outside television ==
In March 2000, "David Agnew" was used for a Doctor Who book, the short story anthology Short Trips and Sidesteps, in homage to the pseudonym's use on the television series. Agnew was also the subject of The Elusive David Agnew, a mockumentary directed by "Allen Smithee" on the DVD release of The Invasion of Time. A character in the 2013 Doctor Who short novel The Death Pit, by A. L. Kennedy, is named David Agnew.

== Related pseudonyms ==
- Walter Plinge
- Alan Smithee
- George Spelvin
