= Underworld (Doctor Who) =

1978 Doctor Who serial

096 – Underworld
- Doctor Who serial

Cast
- Doctor: Tom Baker – Fourth Doctor
- Companions: Louise Jameson – Leela; John Leeson (Voice of K9)
- Others: James Maxwell – Jackson; Alan Lake – Herrick; Jonathan Newth – Orfe; Imogen Bickford-Smith – Tala; James Marcus – Rask; Godfrey James – Tarn; Jimmy Gardner – Idmon; Norman Tipton – Idas; Jay Neill – Klimt; Frank Jarvis – Ankh; Richard Shaw – Lakh; Stacey Tendeter – Naia; Christine Pollon – Voice of the Oracle

Production
- Directed by: Norman Stewart
- Written by: Bob Baker; Dave Martin
- Script editor: Anthony Read
- Produced by: Graham Williams
- Executive producer: None
- Music by: Dudley Simpson
- Production code: 4Y
- Series: Season 15
- Running time: 4 episodes, 22 minutes each
- First broadcast: 7–28 January 1978

Chronology
← Preceded by The Sun Makers	Followed by → The Invasion of Time

Underworld is the fifth serial of the 15th season of the British science fiction television series Doctor Who, which was first broadcast in four weekly parts on BBC1 from 7 to 28 January 1978.

In the serial, the crew of an alien Minyan spaceship go on a hundred-thousand-year quest in search of a ship containing a genetic bank that would restore the Minyans' species.

== Plot ==
At the edge of the expanding universe, the TARDIS materialises on a Minyan ship, the R1C. The Fourth Doctor, Leela and K9 visit the bridge of the ship. The crew – Jackson, Herrick, Orfe and Tala – are on a quest that has taken many millennia. Their aim is to find the missing ship, the P7E, which disappeared en route to Minyos II while carrying the genetic race banks of the entire species. They have finally traced the P7E’s signal and head into a spiral nebula. P7E is the centre of a small planet that the R1C crashes into.

Most of the planet's population, the Trogs, live as slaves digging rock for fuel and sustenance, but they are culled and killed in rock collapses called Skyfalls. This situation is overseen by guards who are in turn responsible to two robots called Seers. In overall control is the Oracle, a powerful super-computer which has shaped the society. The Doctor and Leela encounter Idas, a young man nearly killed in a Skyfall, learning how the local population is managed and terrorised. The Seers and Oracle exist in a protected Citadel at the heart of the planet and the Doctor, Leela and Idas venture there, in the process rescuing Idas’ father Idmon who was due to be sacrificed to the Oracle. Other slaves are freed too, and flee to the R1C where Jackson welcomes them. The Doctor, Leela, and Idas venture to the Citadel to get the race banks still in control of the Oracle. However, the Seers have meanwhile captured Herrick and give him what he thinks are the two race banks to take back to his ship. Jackson, Orfe and Tala are overjoyed, not realising that their friend has actually brought fission bombs back to the R1C.

The Doctor makes it to the core of the Citadel and confronts the Oracle. He locates and steals the real race banks and leaves with Leela and Idas to get back to the probe ship. The Doctor gives the real race banks to Jackson, and then takes the fakes out of the craft. Idas takes advantage of the situation to round up the other Trogs and lead them to the safety of the R1C, while the Doctor engineers the return of the fission grenades to the Oracle. With moments to spare, the R1C blasts away, loaded with the Trogs and the race banks, and is pushed outward from the planet by the explosion of the fission grenades. The TARDIS crew depart, wishing the Minyans well as they journey on to Minyos II, their quest complete.

== Production ==
Underworld was recorded entirely in-studio in October 1977. In an attempt to save money on production costs, the serial was recorded using the Colour Separation Overlay (CSO) technique. This approach involves recording the actors against a bluescreen, and superimposing them, live, on models of the sets – thus saving on the costs involved in set construction.

== Background ==
The serial borrows many elements and parallels from Greek mythology, in much the same way as the later The Horns of Nimon. In particular, the story draws on the tale of Jason and the Argonauts. References include the "Minyan" race (related to the Minoans), the search for "P7E" (Persephone), and character names such as Jackson ("Jason"), Orfe ("Orpheus"), Herrick ("Heracles"), Tala ("Talaus"), Idmon and Idas. The connection is highlighted at the end of the episode, with the Doctor likening Jackson and his journey to Jason and his quest for the Golden Fleece.

== Broadcast and reception ==
Episode	Title	Run time	Original release date	UK viewers (millions)
1	"Part One"	22:36	7 January 1978	8.9
2	"Part Two"	21:27	14 January 1978	9.1
3	"Part Three"	22:21	21 January 1978	8.9
4	"Part Four"	22:53	28 January 1978	11.7

Paul Cornell, Martin Day, and Keith Topping wrote of the serial in The Discontinuity Guide (1995), "The direction is a bit lazy, and the design could be better ... The plot settles down to be dullish, but much more worthy than its reputation would suggest. The CSO's not that bad, either." In The Television Companion (1998), David J. Howe and Stephen James Walker noted the bad reputation the serial had, but felt that it was better than that and a good example of the era. They praised the extra level the story takes by offering comparisons to Greek mythology, as well as the model work and CSO. In 2010, Patrick Mulkern of Radio Times panned the story and its "vapid characterisation, dodgy science and a dearth of anything dramatically engaging". While he liked some scenes and also found the visual effects good, he did not feel that compensated for the unengaging story and lack of comedic direction.

== Commercial releases ==
=== In print ===
Doctor Who and the Underworld
- Author: Terrance Dicks
- Cover artist: Bill Donohoe
- Series: Doctor Who book: Target novelisations
- Release number: 67
- Publisher: Target Books
- Publication date: 24 January 1980
- ISBN: 0-426-20068-3

A novelisation of this serial, written by Terrance Dicks, was published by Target Books in January 1980 under the title Doctor Who and the Underworld. The novelisation opens with a lengthy history of the Minyans and the P7-E.

=== Home media ===
Underworld was released on VHS in March 2002. It was released on the U.S. iTunes Store in August 2008. The story was released on 29 March 2010 in a DVD box set called "Myths and Legends" along with the Third Doctor serial The Time Monster and the Fourth Doctor serial The Horns of Nimon. It was released individually in Region 1 on 7 July 2010. In March 2024, the story was released again in an upgraded format for Blu-ray, being included with the other stories from Season 15 in the Doctor Who - The Collection Box Set.
