= Tom Kelly (actor) =

British actor

- Occupation: Actor
- Notable work: Doctor Who; Blake's 7 Sapphire & Steel; Dempsey and Makepeace

Tom Kelly is a British actor.

He appeared in three Doctor Who serials (The Face of Evil, The Sun Makers and The Invasion of Time), as well as Blake's 7, Sapphire & Steel and Dempsey and Makepeace.
