= Scott Fredericks =

Irish actor (1943–2017)

- Scott Fredericks as Maximillian Stael in "Image of the Fendahl" (1977)
- Born: Frederick Wehrly; 15 March 1943; Strandhill, County Sligo, Ireland
- Died: 6 November 2017 (aged 74); Sligo University Hospital, The Mall, Rathquarter, Sligo, County Sligo, Ireland
- Occupation: Actor
- Children: 2

Scott Fredericks (born Frederick Wehrly; 15 March 1943 – 6 November 2017) was an Irish actor best known for his roles on British television.

== Early life ==
Fredericks was born in Strandhill, County Sligo to Edward Wehrly (d. 2001), a jewellery businessman (Wehrly Bros Limited) of German descent, and Ann (née Shaw).

He left Sligo when he won a scholarship to train at RADA in London, and later adopted the name Scott Fredericks.

== Career ==
Scott Fredericks began his acting career with stage roles at the Chesterfield Repertory. He later worked with director Peter Brook and appeared in West End theatre productions of Antony and Cleopatra (as Mark Antony) and in Becket (as Henry II of England).

After appearing in the television soap opera Crossroads, Scott Fredericks went on to appear in a number of British television programmes in the 1960s, 70s and 1980s, including Z-Cars, Sutherland's Law, Dixon of Dock Green, Blake's 7 (episode "Weapon"), and Triangle. He made two appearances in the Doctor Who, in the serials Day of the Daleks (as Boaz) and Image of the Fendahl (as Max Stael). He also appeared in a 1981 episode of the ITV television police drama, Cribb ("The Hand That Rocks the Cradle") playing Prince Henry of Battenberg.

Fredericks also appeared in such feature films as Dad's Army (1971), See No Evil (1971) and Cal (1984). Whilst working in cinema productions, he once played a game of billiards with Fred Astaire. More recently, he appeared as a regular character in the Irish soap Fair City, as well as spending his time as a radio producer and director in his native Ireland.

Fredericks's stage career included leading roles in the Gate Theatre, Dublin, a long run of Peg o’ My Heart by J. Hartley Manners, and in stage adaptations of Cal and Caught in a Free State with the newly created Irish Theatre Company. For his solo stage show Yeats Remembers Fredericks was awarded the J.J. Finnegan Evening Herald Award in 1980.

=== Filmography ===
Year	Title	Role	Notes
1970	The Rise and Rise of Michael Rimmer	TV Crewman on TV	Uncredited
1971	Dad's Army	Nazi Photographer	
1971	See No Evil	Steve's Man	
1974	From Beyond the Grave	Man at Seance	(segment 1 "The Gate Crasher"), Uncredited
1976	The Deadly Females	Mark	
1984	Cal	Soldier at Farm	

== Death ==
Fredericks suffered from smoking-related illnesses and toward the end of his life had undergone a lung lobectomy and suffered from an aneurysm. Fredericks died in 2017 at Sligo University Hospital in Ireland. His funeral was held at Cathedral of the Immaculate Conception, Sligo and he was buried in Sligo Cemetery. Fredericks was survived by his two sons.
