= George Spenton-Foster =

TV director and producer (1926–1993)

- Born: Thomas George Spenton; 11 November 1926; Lambeth, London, England
- Died: 26 December 1993 (aged 67); Lambeth, London, England
- Occupations: Television director and producer

George Spenton-Foster (11 November 1926 – 26 December 1993) was a British television director and television producer.

== Career ==
Joining the BBC in 1948 as George Spenton, he worked as a call boy on productions including The Quatermass Experiment. A move to production assistant led to a promotion as director in 1963, adopting Spenton-Foster as his professional surname by the mid-sixties.

After producing a few anthology series in his homeland like Thirty-Minute Theatre, he went to Australia in 1968 to produce a short-lived police series The Link Men (1970). For the BBC, Spenton-Foster directed two Doctor Who stories: Image of the Fendahl (1977) and The Ribos Operation (1978). He also directed four Blake's 7 episodes from its second series in 1979: "Weapon", "Pressure Point", "Voice from the Past" and "Gambit".

In late 1982, Spenton-Foster left the Liverpool-based soap opera Brookside four days before it aired because of a disagreement over bad language in the dialogue.

== Personal life ==
His cousin was the actress and singer Queenie Watts (Mary Spenton).

According to Tom Baker, Spenton-Foster was quite a lonely person. The director found consolation in alcohol, leading to a drink problem, resulting in his death on Boxing Day 1993.
