= John Canning Jr. =

American businessman

John A. Canning Jr.
- Education: Denison University; Duke University School of Law
- Occupation: Private equity investor
- Employer: Madison Dearborn Partners
- Known for: Founder of Madison Dearborn Partners, Co-owner of Milwaukee Brewers, Potential buyer of Chicago Cubs

John A. Canning Jr. is a private equity investor and sports executive. He is the founder and chairman of Madison Dearborn Partners, the large Chicago-based private equity firm.

== Career ==
Canning was an early investor in private equity in the late 1970s and early 1980s. Canning founded Madison Dearborn Partners in 1992. Since then the firm has raised over $14 billion of investor commitments. Prior to founding Madison Dearborn, Canning and his team had previously made private equity investments for First Chicago Corporation. Canning joined The First National Bank of Chicago in 1968 and spent 24 years with the bank serving as Executive Vice President of the bank and later as President of First Chicago Venture Capital, the predecessor of Madison Dearborn.

=== Board Memberships ===
Canning currently serves on the Boards of Directors of

- Milwaukee Brewers Baseball Club (Canning is a minority owner)
- Exelon Corporation
- TransUnion
- Northwestern Memorial Hospital
- Children’s Inner City Educational Fund
- The Economic Club of Chicago
- Corning Incorporated

Canning currently serves on the Boards of Trustees of:

- Northwestern University
- Field Museum of Natural History
- Museum of Science and Industry
- Big Shoulders Fund

Canning is a member of the Public Advisory Board of the American Joint Replacement Registry.

Canning also serves as a commissioner of the Irish Pension Reserve Fund, a trustee and chairman of The Chicago Community Trust as well as a director and chairman of the Federal Reserve Bank of Chicago.

Previously, he served on the Board of Trustees at the Mary and Leigh Block Museum of Art in 2013.

=== Education ===
Canning received his undergraduate degree from Denison University in 1966 and a J.D. from Duke University in 1969.

== Awards ==
John Canning Jr. was inducted as a Laureate of The Lincoln Academy of Illinois and awarded the Order of Lincoln (the State’s highest honor) by Illinois Governor Pat Quinn in 2014 in the area of Business & Industry.
