= Sontaran =

Alien species from the television show Doctor Who

Sontarans
- Doctor Who race
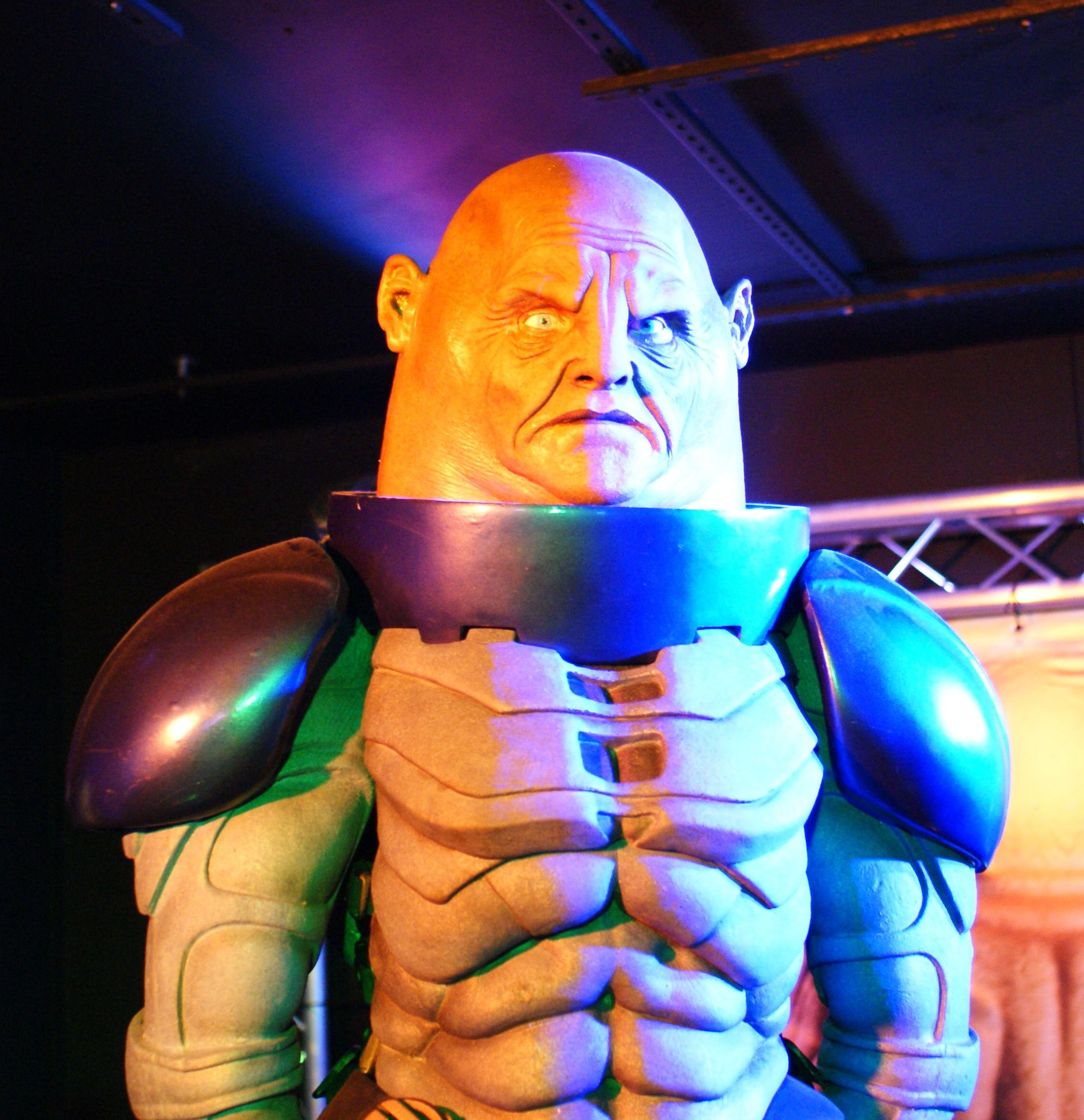
- The 2008 redesign of the Sontarans, as displayed at the Doctor Who Experience in 2008.
- First appearance: The Time Warrior (1973)
- Created by: Robert Holmes

In-universe information
- Home world: Sontar

The Sontarans (/sɒnˈtɑːrən/ son-TAR-ən) are an alien species that appear in the British science fiction television programme Doctor Who and its spin-off series The Sarah Jane Adventures. In-universe, they are a clone race bred to fight a never-ending war against a species known as the Rutans. They first appeared in the 1973 serial The Time Warrior, where a Sontaran uses time travel technology to try to return to his home planet. The Sontarans have gone on to be recurring antagonists within the series. A Sontaran named Strax serves as a supporting character and as a member of the Paternoster Gang.

The Sontarans were created by writer Robert Holmes, who conceived of the Sontarans after reading the 1832 war treatise On War. He was also inspired by the history of the Vietnam War. The Sontarans' design would change throughout the years, with different Sontarans being portrayed by a variety of different actors.

Some critics found the Sontarans to be among the more successful and popular alien species on the show, while others thought they were under-used or taken less seriously in the series.

== Appearances ==
Doctor Who is a long-running British science-fiction television series that began in 1963. It stars its protagonist, The Doctor, an alien who travels through time and space in a ship known as the TARDIS, as well as their travelling companions. When the Doctor dies, they are able to undergo a process known as "regeneration", completely changing the Doctor's appearance and personality. Throughout their travels, the Doctor often comes into conflict with various alien species and antagonists.

The Sontarans are a clone race that hail from the planet Sontar, and are bred for war from birth. They are engaged in a constant, never-ending war against a species known as the Rutans. They have a culture dedicated almost solely to war, where dying in battle is the ultimate honour among their race, as is entering a battle without a protective helmet. They also have a war chant consisting of the phrase "Sontar-ha!" Sontarans only have a single weak point: a "probic vent" on the back of their neck, through which they receive energy. A single hit here can result in heavy damage. Sontarans are physically shorter than humans due to their homeworld planet having high gravity. Sontarans are capable of genetically modifying themselves, even allowing them to produce breast milk. Sontarans only have one gender and are also sexist against women by nature, associating womanhood with weakness.

=== Television ===
The Sontarans first appear in the 1973 serial The Time Warrior, where a Sontaran named Linx crash lands on Earth in the past and attempts to use time travel technology to fix his ship and return to combat. A Sontaran named Styre appears in the 1975 serial The Sontaran Experiment, where in the far future he seeks to test the strength of humans left to survive on an Earth ravaged by solar flares. The Fourth Doctor kills Styre and stops a further Sontaran invasion. The Sontarans then appear in the 1978 serial The Invasion of Time, where the Sontarans, under commander Stor, lead an invasion of Gallifrey, the Doctor's home planet; they are defeated by the Doctor. They next appear in the 1985 serial The Two Doctors, where a pair of Sontarans named Stike and Varl plan to obtain more powerful time travel technology from human scientists, but end up being killed by their allies, the Androgums.

In the show's 2005 revival, the Sontarans appear in the two-part story "The Sontaran Stratagem" and "The Poison Sky" (both 2008). They try to xenoform Earth into a new cloning planet, but the Tenth Doctor destroys their ship, halting the invasion. The Sontarans make subsequent cameos in the episodes "The End of Time" (2009–2010), "The Pandorica Opens" (2010), and "Face the Raven" (2015). They later appear as antagonists in Doctor Who: Flux, the 2021 series of the revival, first appearing in "The Halloween Apocalypse" (2021). As part of a scheme to conquer Earth from all points in time in "War of the Sontarans" (2021), they change the timeline of the Crimean War, but are defeated by the Thirteenth Doctor and her allies. The Sontarans later invade Earth again during "The Vanquishers" (2021), where they use humans to pinpoint the location of the flux, a destructive anti-matter wave. The Sontarans aim to use the flux to wipe out the Daleks and Cybermen but end up being destroyed by it and the Doctor.

A former Sontaran commander named Kaagh, a survivor of the invasion of Earth from "The Sontaran Stratagem" and "The Poison Sky", appears in The Sarah Jane Adventures serials The Last Sontaran and Enemy of the Bane. In the former serial, he tries to return to Sontar, but later ends up allying with antagonist Mrs. Wormwood to conquer the universe in the latter serial. Kaagh later sacrifices himself after he realises Wormwood will betray him. Another Sontaran named Strax appears as a supporting character in the main television series. Debuting in the 2011 episode "A Good Man Goes to War", Strax was punished for cowardice by his people, who forced him to serve as a nurse. Strax would later join the Silurian Madame Vastra and human Jenny Flint as part of the Paternoster Gang, serving in a comedic role as their butler. Strax subsequently appears in "The Snowmen" (2012), "The Crimson Horror" (2013), "The Name of the Doctor" (2013), and "Deep Breath" (2014).

=== Spin-off media ===
The Sontarans appear in several media spin-offs for the series, including novels, comics, audio dramas, and video games. The Sontarans also appear in the spin-off films Mindgame and Shakedown: Return of the Sontarans.

== Development ==
=== Classic era ===
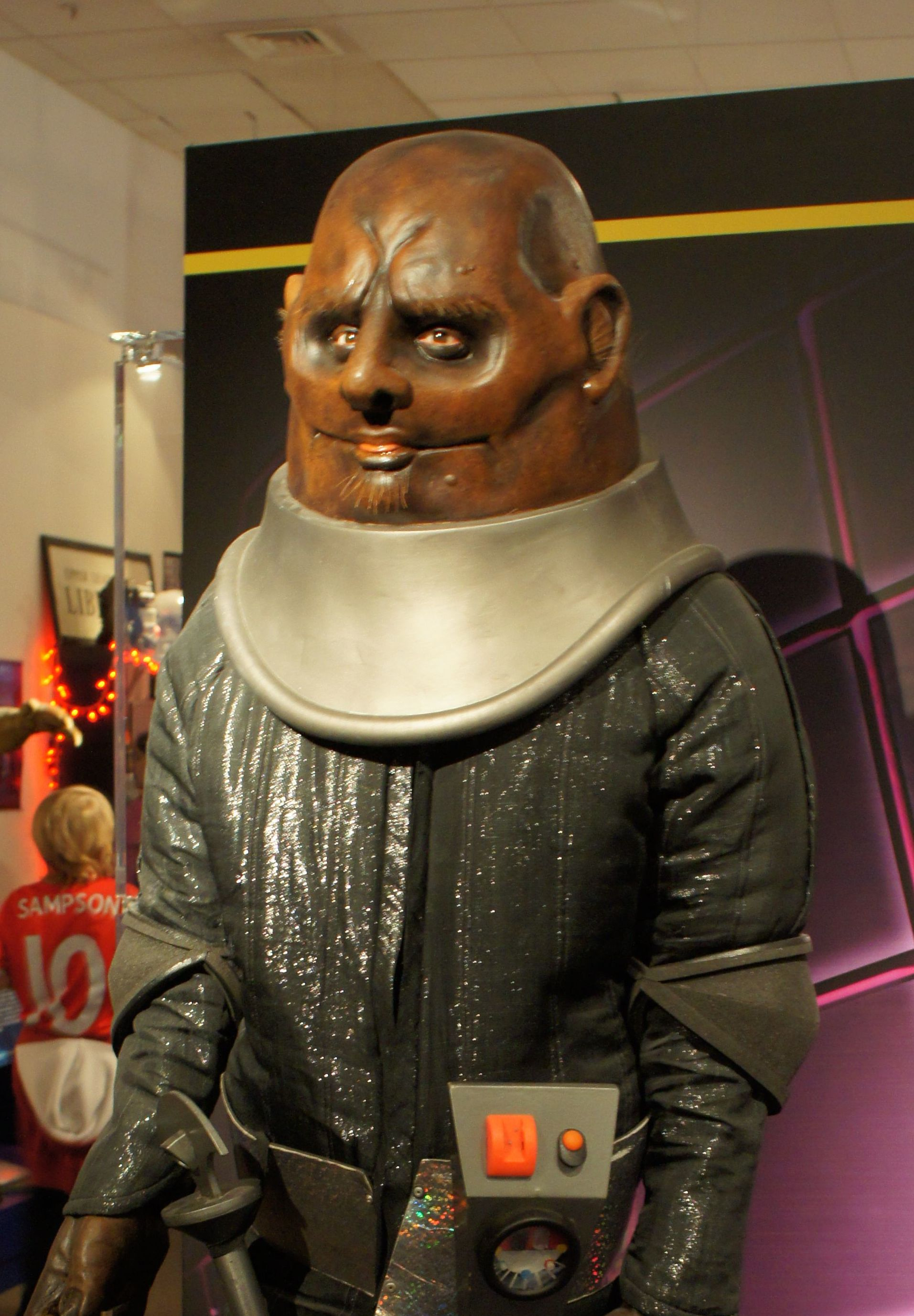
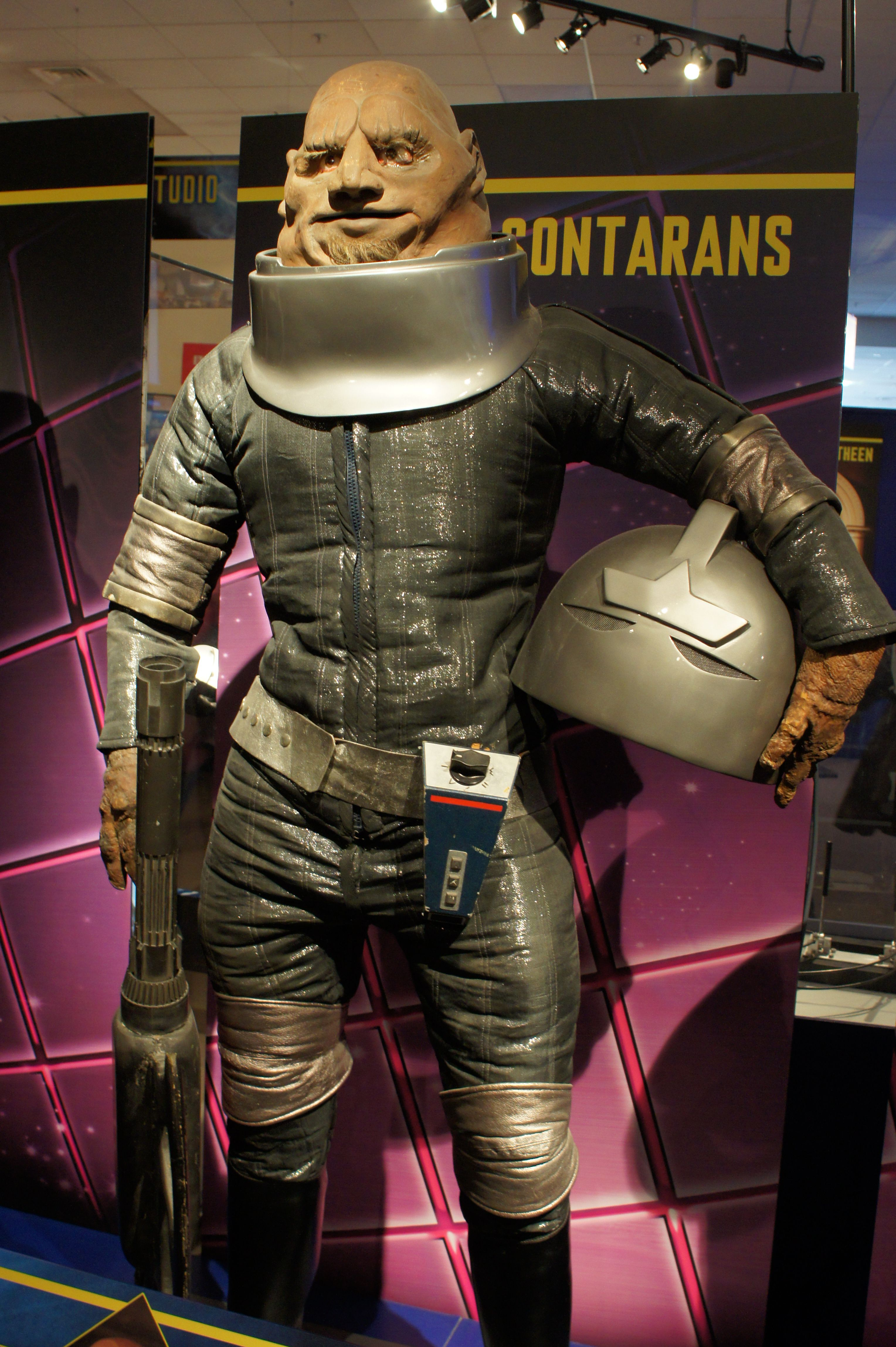
The Sontarans as they appeared in The Time Warrior and The Two Doctors, respectively, on display at the Doctor Who Experience

The Sontarans were originally created for the 1973 serial The Time Warrior by writer Robert Holmes. Holmes conceived of the Sontarans after reading the 1832 war treatise On War, and was additionally inspired by the history of the Vietnam War. In the script, the Sontaran is described as being "squat", wearing armour resembling that of a medieval knight. The Sontarans' physical appearance in the serial was created by costume designer James Acheson and make-up designer Sandra Exelby. Linx, the Sontaran in this serial, was portrayed by actor Kevin Lindsay. Lindsay wore a prosthetic mask, make-up, and occasionally a helmet, which was a challenge during filming due to his heart condition.

Holmes wished to re-use the Sontarans in the 1974–1975 season. This would allow him to collect a fee and make it possible for the production team to make use of Linx's costume again. Holmes briefed the serial's writers, Bob Baker and Dave Martin on the Sontarans' lore and history to ensure an accurate depiction in the serial (dubbed The Sontaran Experiment). Holmes re-wrote dialogue in the final script to fit his vision for the species. Styre, the Sontaran in the serial, was modelled on Nazi generals in terms of his behaviour and actions.

Although the production team had hoped to re-use the Linx costume and prosthetic mask, the mask was in poor condition, requiring a new one to be made. The new head of the Sontaran was much larger, with a different skin tone compared to the Sontarans' prior appearance. Despite his heart condition, Lindsay returned for the serial to portray Styre, the Sontaran commander. To alleviate the strain Lindsay experienced in the previous serial, he wore less intensive makeup and prosthetics and only wore the Sontaran helmet for a single scene. Lindsay also portrayed the Sontaran Marshal with whom Styre communicates in the serial, characterised by an insignia on the costume's collar. Stuntman Stuart Fell filled in for Lindsay in several intensive scenes.

The 1978 serial The Invasion of Time had a troubled production, and its original antagonists, a race of cat people, could not be used as adversaries due to complications during development. Producer Graham Williams decided that since no returning antagonists had been used in the 1978 season at that point, the Sontarans could be used, as Williams was fond of them. Holmes agreed to let the production team use the Sontarans, knowing they were in a tough spot in production, but was uncomfortable about other writers using the character. Since Lindsay had died in 1975, the role of Sontaran commander Stor was portrayed by actor Derek Deadman. New costumes were created for the serial, with the Sontarans having another change in skin-tone and dark rims placed around Styre's eyes to show that he was stressed by his leadership role as commander.

For the 1985 season of the show, producer John Nathan-Turner wanted the Sontarans to return. Though several Sontaran serials had been pitched before this time, this serial was the only one that was produced. Holmes had recently returned to writing for the series, but he disliked bringing back returning monsters. He was convinced to write the serial as it would allow him to make up for what he saw as the mishandling of the Sontarans in their prior two appearances. New masks and costumes were developed, with the masks custom-made for the two Sontarans, Stike and Varl. The masks and costumes were based on those used in previous Sontaran appearances. Actors Clinton Greyn and Tim Raynham portrayed Stike and Varl, respectively. This version of the Sontarans was much taller than in previous appearances. As part of the publicity for the serial, a special segment featuring the Sontarans, titled A Fix With Sontarans, aired on the show Jim'll Fix It.

=== Revived era ===
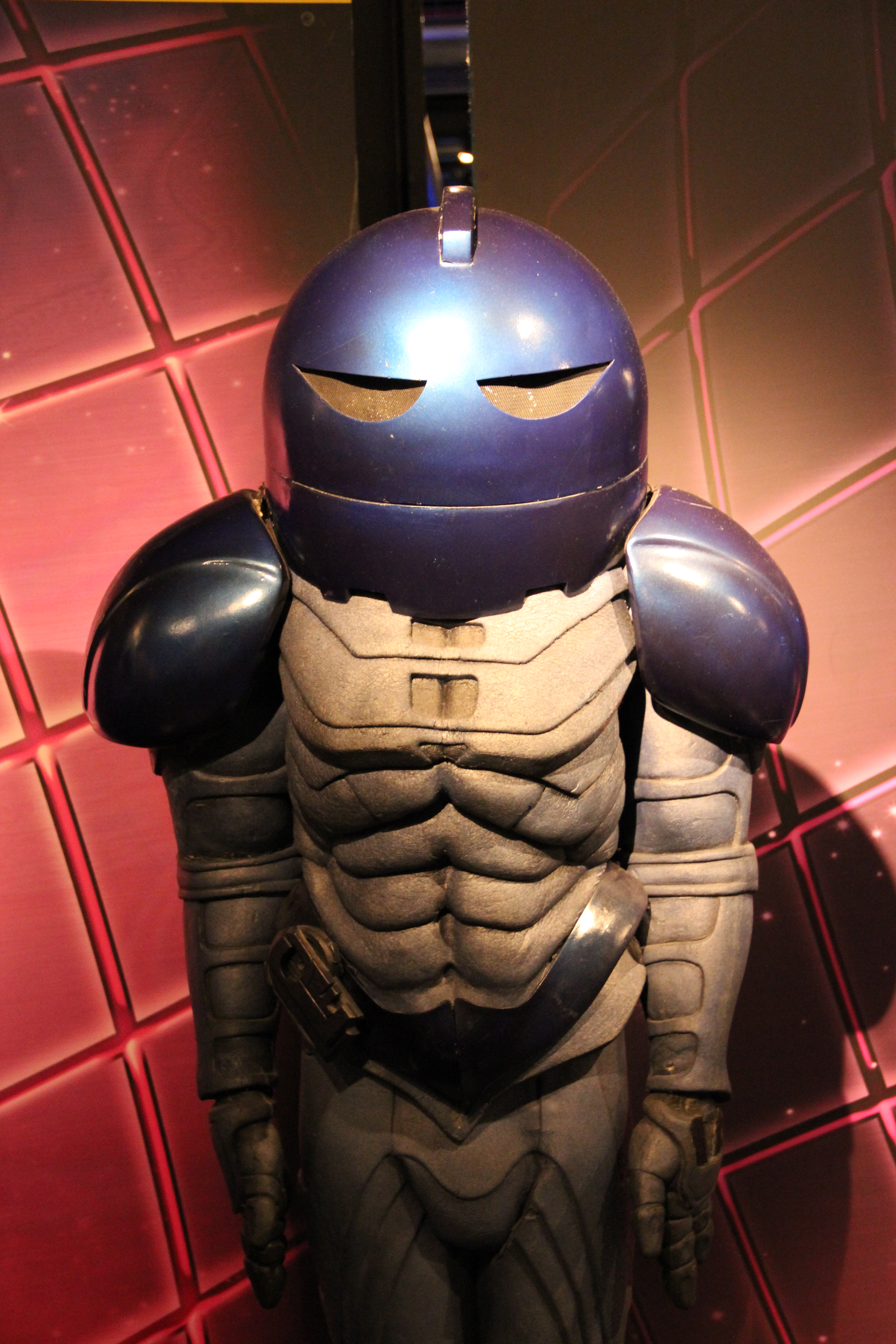
A Sontaran as it appears with its 2008 design, on display at the Doctor Who Experience

For the show's 2005 revival, showrunner Russell T Davies had wanted to bring back the Sontarans for some time, eventually electing to bring them back in the 2008 two-part story "The Sontaran Stratagem" and "The Poison Sky". Davies believed the Sontarans' culture and personality had more potential for strong dialogue than other returning antagonists such as the Daleks and Cybermen, and also felt they would be easy for children to draw, as well as visually striking. This version of the Sontarans was designed by Neill Gorton of Millennium FX, with a pitch to make the Sontarans resemble their original appearance with a modern update. The Sontarans' armour was re-coloured blue, while the Sontarans themselves were designed with a more furrowed brow, giving them an "angrier" look. Davies believed that shorter actors should portray the Sontarans, akin to their older appearances. The costumes were modelled on actor Christopher Ryan, who portrays the Sontaran commander Staal in the story. The production team found other actors who would fit within Ryan's body cast to perform in the role of other Sontarans in the episode.

Phil Ford, a writer for the spin-off series The Sarah Jane Adventures, was keen on adapting the Sontarans into the series, resulting in their appearance in The Last Sontaran, the first serial of the show's second season. Though many Sontaran props and objects could be re-used from the main show in the serial, Kaagh (portrayed by actor Anthony O'Donnell), the Sontaran who appears in the episode, had a new cast taken for his armour instead of re-using the old one. Kaagh was later brought back for the season finale, Enemy of the Bane. In an unused script for writer Gareth Roberts's later serial Death of the Doctor, a Sontaran named Skorm would have appeared; Skorm's concept would later be adapted into Strax (portrayed by Dan Starkey) in the 2011 episode "A Good Man Goes to War". Strax would go on to serve as a recurring character in the main Doctor Who series. Steven Moffat, the creator of Strax, said that his continued appearances came about due to his popularity among fans, particularly alongside Madame Vastra and Jenny Flint, who had debuted in the same episode. A Sontaran named Skarn was later planned to appear in the 2015 episode "Face the Raven", where he would have been responsible for a murder at an alien refugee camp while plotting to enact war. This plan was scrapped as the script was rewritten, though a Sontaran would end up having a cameo in the final episode.

For their re-appearance in Doctor Who: Flux, then-showrunner Chris Chibnall aimed to return the Sontarans to a level of threat with audiences that they had not been at in some time. Costume designer Ray Holman and prosthetics expert Danny Marie Elias worked together on the new design. Compared to the 2008 design, these new Sontarans were built to be "dirtier" to convey their experience in battle. The design took inspiration from the Sontarans' appearance in the classic era, particularly from their appearances in the 1970s. According to Sontaran actor Jonathan Watson, who portrays the Sontaran commander Skaak, the Sontarans were originally intended to be written out of Flux after "War of the Sontarans", with scripts re-written during filming to facilitate a later return.

== Reception and analysis ==
Graham Sleight, writing in the book The Doctor's Monsters, regarded the Sontarans as a success. Despite being an "average" monster conceptually, the Sontarans had a thoroughly well-defined culture. Radio Times identified the Sontarans as among the more iconic monsters within the series that are popular with fans, with their design and culture a fan favourite. Adi Tantimedh, writing for Bleeding Cool, observed that the Sontarans symbolised the constant warfare linked to fascism, with their tactics and plans more akin to Cold War-era fears. She viewed the Sontarans as a species who only improved with further appearances, as budget increases allowed their design to become more detailed.

Sleight felt the Sontarans' subsequent appearances were less in-depth than their first, and that their culture was often less well-defined, reducing them to unremarkable antagonists. Sleight saw the appearance of the Sontarans in the revival as a step-up from classic era appearances, with the improved visual quality of the Sontarans and expanded culture. The book Inside the TARDIS argued that the Sontarans' return in the revival was a failure compared to other returns, as the Sontarans were taken less seriously as antagonists and were described as an "embarrassment". Mick Joest, writing for CinemaBlend, remarked that following the Sontarans' appearances in the show's revival, the race had largely been reduced to comic relief instead of as a genuine threat. Radio Times agreed, stating that because of their limited appearances compared to other monsters like the Daleks and Cybermen, the Sontarans were unable to capitalise on their story potential; additionally due to Strax's increased comic relief prominence in the series, the Sontarans came off in a more comedic fashion than they did before.

The book The Science of Doctor Who analysed the Sontarans' cloning technology and feeding via probic vent in terms of real-world feasibility. The book noted that for their manner of cloning and feeding to work, Sontarans would need to be much more complicated biologically than they are depicted on-screen.
