= The Invasion of Time =

097 – The Invasion of Time
- Doctor Who serial

Cast
- Doctor: Tom Baker – Fourth Doctor
- Companions: Louise Jameson – Leela; John Leeson (Voice of K9)
- Others: John Arnatt – Chancellor Borusa; Milton Johns – Castellan Kelner; Chris Tranchell – Andred; Charles Morgan – Gold Usher; Hilary Ryan – Rodan; Dennis Edwards – Lord Gomer; Reginald Jessup – Lord Savar; Michael Harley – Bodyguard; Eric Danot, Christopher Christou – Guards; Max Faulkner – Nesbin; Ray Callaghan – Ablif; Michael Mundell – Jasko; Gai Smith – Presta; Stan McGowan, Tom Kelly – Vardans; Derek Deadman – Stor; Stuart Fell – Sontaran

Production
- Directed by: Gerald Blake
- Written by: "David Agnew" (Graham Williams and Anthony Read)
- Script editor: Anthony Read
- Produced by: Graham Williams
- Executive producer: None
- Music by: Dudley Simpson
- Production code: 4Z
- Series: Season 15
- Running time: 6 episodes, 25 minutes each
- First broadcast: 4 February – 11 March 1978

Chronology
← Preceded by Underworld	Followed by → The Ribos Operation

The Invasion of Time is the sixth and final serial of the 15th season of the British science fiction television series Doctor Who, which was first broadcast in six weekly parts on BBC1 from 4 February to 11 March 1978. It features the final appearance of Louise Jameson as the companion Leela.

In the serial, the Vardans break the defences of Gallifrey to allow the Sontarans to invade and control the power of the Time Lords.

== Plot ==
To the confusion of Leela and K9, the Fourth Doctor has a covert meeting with aliens before taking his companions to the Citadel at Gallifrey. Once there, he lays claim to the vacant Presidency as his right by Time Lord law—he is the only candidate, as established in the story The Deadly Assassin. While reviewing the presidential suite, he orders it lined with lead. During his induction ceremony, the Crown of Rassilon seems to reject him, and he's injured. Leela tries to help him but is accused of having attacked him and is banished from the Citadel.

In front of the gathered Time Lords, the Doctor greets three figures that materialise within the Citadel, the Vardans, whom he had met before coming to Gallifrey, and addresses them as the Time Lords' new masters. Amid the confusion, the compliant Castellan Kelner kowtows to the Vardans and assists them in taking over, issuing arrests and ordering banishment for any Time Lords that he sees as disloyal. The Doctor confides in Chancellor Borusa, once they're in his lead-lined suite, that the Vardans can read their thoughts but not through lead. The Doctor plans to lock the Vardans in a time lock on their home planet as they are a dangerous race, but needed to keep up this facade to determine the location of their homeworld. He later explains the same to the Citadel guard commander Andred, and that he banished Leela for her own safety.

Meanwhile, Leela has faith that the Doctor's actions are towards a larger goal, and along with the banished Time Lady Rodan, travel across the wastelands of Gallifrey. They meet a group of outsiders that have abandoned Time Lord ways, led by Nesbin. Leela explains the situation at the Citadel, and Nesbin agrees to help, assembling a resistance force to help take the Citadel back.

When Kelner and the Vardans accuse the Doctor of being untrustworthy, he offers to show his commitment by dismantling the quantum forcefield that surrounds Gallifrey, which would allow the Vardans' full invasion force to arrive. However, the Doctor tricks them, and only creates a small hole in the forcefield, large enough for K9 to trace the Vardans to their home planet and engage the time lock, causing the Vardans to disappear.

A squad of Sontaran warriors transport into the Citadel. Their leader, Commander Stor, explains they used the Vardans to disable the forcefield, and seizes control of the Citadel. While Kelner quickly aligns with the Sontarans, the Doctor, Borusa, and their allies escape, regrouping with Leela, Rodan, Nesbin, and the other outsiders. Leela joins Andred to defend the Citadel with the resistance group and Citadel guards, while Rodan repairs the forcefield. The Doctor wants the Great Key of Rassilon, to power a Demat Gun, a weapon that erases its target from all of time, but there is no record of it. He deduces that Rassilon gave the key to the first chancellor and that its location has been handed down from chancellor to chancellor ever since. He convinces Borusa to give it to him. Stor learns of this and orders a squad of Sontarans to give chase in the Doctor's TARDIS with assistance from Kelner. The Doctor eludes them within the corridors of the TARDIS and constructs the Demat Gun. He goes out into the Citadel to find Stor attempting to destroy the entire galaxy with a bomb. The Doctor fires the Demat Gun, and the Sontaran invaders disappear, ending the threat. When he awakes, the Doctor remembers nothing of the events, and Borusa calls it the "wisdom of Rassilon", as he can return the key to its hiding place. He then has Kelner arrested for treason and starts the process of rebuilding the Citadel.

As the Doctor prepares to leave, Leela announces she plans to stay behind with Andred, as they have found a romantic interest in each other, and K9 also insists he must stay to help Leela. After saying his goodbyes, the Doctor enters the TARDIS, pulls out a large crate labelled "K9 MII".

== Production ==
The script is credited to David Agnew, a pseudonym often used by the BBC for work produced "in house" by contracted production team members. On this occasion it masks the authors Anthony Read (the series' script editor) and Graham Williams (series producer). This story was written as a replacement for another story, The Killers of the Dark by David Weir, which was considered too expensive and complex to shoot. The script was written in just two weeks, with four days for rewrites. Additionally, when asked about the unused script at a convention, Graham Williams, having forgotten the exact title, made up the name "Gin Sengh", as in The Killer Cats of Gin Sengh (or Geng Singh—the spelling being indeterminate), resulting in the fan myth that this was the original title. It was Robert Holmes who suggested to Graham Williams that this story be split into two segments, the first four episodes being based around the Vardans and the final two episodes being based around the Sontarans who come into the story at the end of episode 4.

Louise Jameson, who had already announced her departure from the show, reportedly wished for her character, Leela, to be killed at the end of the series, and was disappointed that Leela instead opted to stay behind on Gallifrey with Andred, even though nothing in the script suggests a romance between the two characters. The producers decided that killing off her character would be too traumatic for younger viewers.

An industrial strike, which was eventually resolved before production, forced the studio sets to be constructed within St Anne's Hospital in Redhill as the BBC's Christmas holiday specials were given priority in the regular studios. As a result of the industrial strike, Graham Williams was given the option of not producing the final six episodes of the season and have the money rollover into the next season. Williams rejected this because of the additional problem of inflation that year and didn't want the budgeted money to depreciate even further.

In addition to St Anne's Hospital, location filming also took place at British Oxygen, Hammersmith and Beachfields quarry in Redhill, Surrey.

The Sontaran costumes were cumbersome and limited the field of vision of the actors wearing them, so much so that they are often seen tripping through and over props. At one point, a Sontaran (played by the actor Stuart Fell) nearly takes a fall after missing a short jump and landing on a pool chair. As the aliens originate on a planet of notably high gravity, however, their clumsiness is easily explained.

The closing credits of episodes three, four, and six feature the return of the section of Doctor Who theme commonly called the "Middle Eight", this sequence not having been heard since the early Jon Pertwee era.

=== Cast notes ===
Milton Johns had previously appeared as Benik in The Enemy of the World (1967–68) and Guy Crayford in The Android Invasion (1975). Christopher Tranchell had previously played Roger Colbert in The Massacre of St Bartholomew's Eve (1966) and Jenkins in The Faceless Ones (1967).

== Analysis ==
Writer and journalist Matthew Sweet has compared the Doctor's strategy of feigning madness in this story to Hamlet.

== Broadcast and reception ==
Episode	Title	Run time	Original release date	UK viewers (millions)
1	"Part One"	25:00	4 February 1978	11.2
2	"Part Two"	25:00	11 February 1978	11.4
3	"Part Three"	25:00	18 February 1978	9.5
4	"Part Four"	23:31	25 February 1978	10.9
5	"Part Five"	25:00	4 March 1978	10.3
6	"Part Six"	25:44	11 March 1978	9.8

Following transmission of the story, producer Graham Williams met with Head of Serials Graeme MacDonald, and they agreed that the story had contained too high a level of humour, resulting in a lack of credibility in Stor, and a lack of dramatic tension, and that in future any humour in the programme should counterpoint and strengthen the story rather than undermine and weaken it. Memos to this effect were to be issued to future directors of the show, in order to preserve a level of seriousness that both men felt to be necessary; however, the humorous trend continued until Williams' tenure came to an end in 1979.

Paul Cornell, Martin Day, and Keith Topping wrote in The Discontinuity Guide (1995) that the serial "stands up reasonably well", though the Vardans' appearances were "ludicrous". In The Television Companion (1998), David J. Howe and Stephen James Walker wrote that the story was "something of a mess". Although there were good special effects, they stated it had a lack of good characters, found Baker's performance to be "below par", and criticised the "pathetic" Vardans. In 2010, Mark Braxton of Radio Times was also disappointed, finding many "inept sequences". He also criticised the way Leela was written in the serial, as well as her sudden departure. DVD Talk's John Sinnott was more positive, giving the serial four out of five stars. He acknowledged that it was "a flawed and uneven adventure" with issues in plot logic, but it succeeded in "goofy fun" with a good performance by Baker. Charlie Jane Anders of io9 listed the cliffhanger to Episode Two—in which it appears the Doctor is evil—as one of the greatest cliffhangers in the history of the programme in 2010.

== Commercial releases ==
=== In print ===
Doctor Who and the Invasion of Time
- Author: Terrance Dicks
- Cover artist: Andrew Skilleter
- Series: Doctor Who book: Target novelisations
- Release number: 35
- Publisher: Target Books
- Publication date: 21 February 1980
- ISBN: 0-426-20093-4

Terrance Dicks' novelisation was published by Target Books in February 1980.

=== Home media ===
It was released on a two tape VHS set in March 2000 and on DVD on 5 May 2008. The DVD has optional brand-new CGI effects. The NTSC Region 1 version was released on 3 September 2008. It has also been released in a DVD box set titled Bred for War, along with The Time Warrior, The Sontaran Experiment, and The Two Doctors. This serial was also released as part of the Doctor Who DVD Files in issue 118 on 10 July 2013. In March 2024, the story was released again in an upgraded format for Blu-ray, with new special effects, being included with the other stories from Season 15 in the Doctor Who - The Collection Box Set.
