= Anthony Read =

English television producer, screenwriter, script editor and author

- Born: 21 April 1935; Cheslyn Hay, Staffordshire, England
- Died: 21 November 2015 (aged 80); Taplow, Buckinghamshire
- Education: Royal Central School of Speech and Drama
- Occupations: Author, screenwriter, script editor, television producer
- Writing career
- Period: 1964–2015
- Genres: Comedy, drama, adventure, science fiction

Anthony Read (21 April 1935 – 21 November 2015) was an English television producer, screenwriter, script editor and author. He was principally active in British television from the 1960s to the mid-1980s, which included a period as a script editor and writer of Doctor Who from 1977 to 1979, although he occasionally contributed to televised productions until 1999.

Beginning in the 1980s, he launched a second career as a print author, concentrating largely on World War II histories. He was also a chair of the Writers' Guild of Great Britain. From 2004 he regularly wrote prose fiction, mainly in the form of a revival of his television series The Baker Street Boys (1983).

== Early life ==
Read was born in the small mining community of Cheslyn Hay, Staffordshire. He originally set out to become an actor, due to his education at Queen Mary's Grammar School in Walsall, known for its strong theatrical tradition, and then at the Central School of Speech and Drama in London. General mobilization interrupted his studies, and he founded a theatre company called Theatre Unlimited. However, with his acting career lasting only for a short time, he first became an advertising copywriter, then performed his National Service as a gunner with the Royal Artillery, and later worked as editor at Jonathan Cape.

== Career ==
=== 1960s ===
Read's earliest work was as a freelance writer for the BBC's police drama series Z-Cars in 1962. He became a BBC employee on 2 November 1963. He soon graduated to writer/script editor of several other adventure-mystery series, like the anthological Detective, The Indian Tales of Rudyard Kipling and the version of Sherlock Holmes (1965) with Douglas Wilmer in the lead. The balance of the decade was spent on the drama, The Troubleshooters. A series about the petroleum industry, The Troubleshooters provided Read with the steadiest work of his career. He was the series' original script editor in 1965, and took over as producer from 1969 to 1972.

=== 1970s ===
When he departed The Troubleshooters, Read kept his producer's hat on for a few years, before returning to his more traditional roles of script editing and writing. The Lotus Eaters and The Dragon's Opponent extended his run as a producer of contemporary dramas. It also continued a few key professional relationships he had enjoyed since the mid-1960s. On The Lotus Eaters, Read was reunited with director Douglas Camfield and writer David Fisher.

In 1977, Read was brought into Doctor Who by Graeme MacDonald, head of series and serials, to serve as script editor under the new producer, Graham Williams, replacing Robert Holmes in the middle of the 15th season. In the 16th season, Read worked on the Key to Time story arc and shaped the character of the first Romana, played by Mary Tamm. On Doctor Who he worked again with David Fisher, who wrote two of the Key to Time stories, and then wrote (or co-wrote) three more stories in the next year.

Read was also instrumental in commissioning Douglas Adams as a Doctor Who writer, and for advocating the Hitchhiker's Guide author should be appointed as his replacement as script editor. Read's final contribution to Doctor Who was as writer of The Horns of Nimon, a story based on the myth of the Minotaur. Given the cancellation of Shada, he was thus the final writer of the Graham Williams era on the programme.

Immediately following his stint on Doctor Who in 1979, he contributed the scripts for the episodes Powers of Darkness and Out of Body, Out of Mind to the paranormal thriller series The Omega Factor.

=== 1980s ===
Together with Don Houghton, Read co-wrote the fifth Sapphire & Steel television story, known informally as Dr McDee Must Die. In 1984 Read adapted the John Wyndham novel, Chocky, for Children's ITV. Its success led to two original sequels: Chocky's Children and Chocky's Challenge. In an interview for the DVD release of Chocky, Read revealed that the Wyndham estate considered his adaptation of Chocky to be the best adaptation ever produced from Wyndham's novels.

Read's biggest critical success of the 1980s, however, was The Baker Street Boys (1983). The series' unique approach to the world of Sherlock Holmes gained Read an award from the Writers' Guild of Great Britain.

=== Author ===
During the 1980s, Read gradually began to replace his television work with a burgeoning career in print.

In his second career as an author Read continued his relationship with David Fisher into the world of non-fiction writing. While the majority of Read's books were solo works, he and Fisher collaborated a number of times, almost always to explore some aspect of World War II. Together they wrote The Fall of Berlin (1992), The Deadly Embrace: Hitler, Stalin and the Nazi-Soviet Pact, 1939–1941 (1988), The Proudest Day: India's Long Road to Independence, (1997) Operation Lucy: The Most Secret Spy Ring of the Second World War (1980), Berlin Rising: Biography of a City (1994), Colonel Z: The Secret Life of a Master of Spies (1984), and Kristallnacht: The Nazi Night of Terror. He also wrote "Conspirator: Churchill, Roosevelt, and Tyler Kent, Spy" with Ray Bearse. On his own he wrote The Devil's Disciples: Hitler's Inner Circle (2003) and The World on Fire: 1919 and the Battle with Bolshevism (2008). Read's solo non-fiction works followed a similar interest in World War II, but he occasionally wrote prose fiction. He was the main writer of a series of novels about The Baker Street Boys, a television show for which he wrote in the early 1980s.

== Writers' Guild ==
Read was an active member of the Writers' Guild of Great Britain, serving as chair between 1981 and 1982. He drew up an industry-wide code of practice on behalf of the young writers he was committed to nurturing, never taking pay or expenses for his work on the guild's behalf. He was also a director of the associated Authors' Licensing and Collecting Society. He co-wrote a submission from the Writers' Guild and the Directors and Producers Association to the Annan committee on the future of broadcasting that was subsequently used as part of the charter agreement for establishing Channel 4.

== Writing credits ==
Production	Notes	Broadcaster
Detective	"The Man Who Murdered in Public" (1964)	BBC1
The Indian Tales of Rudyard Kipling	"On the City Wall" (1964); "Private Learoyd's Story" (1964); "Beyond the Pale" (1964)	BBC1
Sherlock Holmes	"The Copper Beeches" (script editor, 1965); "The Man with the Twisted Lip" (script editor, 1965); "The Beryl Coronet" (script editor, 1965); "Charles Augustus Milverton" (script editor, 1965); "The Retired Colourman" (script editor, 1965)	BBC1
This Man Craig	"The Tinks" (1967)	BBC2
The Troubleshooters	6 episodes (1966–1970)	BBC1
Play for Today	"Hell's Angel" (credited as "David Agnew", 1971)	BBC1
Marked Personal	4 episodes (1974)	ITV
Sutherland's Law	"The Partnership" (1974)	BBC1
The Black Arrow	7 episodes (1974–1975)	ITV
Crown Court	"The Personator" (1975); "The Also Ran" (1975)	ITV
BBC2 Playhouse	"Diane" (credited as "David Agnew", 1975)	BBC2
Quiller	"Night of the Father" (1975)	BBC1
Centre Play	"Kipper" (1977)	BBC2
Z-Cars	"Say Goodbye to the Horses" (1976); "Nightwatch" (1976); "Rage" (1977); "Error of Judgement" (1977); "Skeletons" (1977)	BBC1
The Professionals	"Private Madness, Public Danger" (1977); "Long Shot" (1978); "Hunter/Hunted" (1978); "Fugitive" (1980)	ITV
The Standard	"Golden Boy" (1978); "New Standards" (1978)	BBC1
The Omega Factor	"Powers of Darkness" (1979); "Out of Body, Out of Mind" (1979)	BBC1
Doctor Who	"The Invasion of Time" (credited as "David Agnew", 1978); "The Horns of Nimon" (1979)	BBC1
Hammer House of Horror	writer: "Witching Time" (1980); script-editor: all 13 parts	ITV
Into the Labyrinth	"Robin" (1981); "Minotaur" (1981)	ITV
Sapphire & Steel	Story Five (1981); co-written with Don Houghton	ITV
The Baker Street Boys	"The Adventure of the Disappearing Dispatch Case" (1983); "The Case of the Captive Clairvoyant" (1983)	BBC1
Chocky	6 episodes (1984)	ITV
One by One	13 episodes (1984–1985)	BBC1
Chocky's Children	6 episodes (1985)	ITV
Chocky's Challenge	4 episodes (1986)	ITV
The Chief	"Episode #5.3" (1995)	ITV
The Adventures of Swiss Family Robinson	"Princess from the Sea" (1998); "The Treasure Hunt" (1998)	Pax TV
Heartbeat	"Baby Love" (1998)	ITV
A Twist in the Tale	"The Magician" (1999)	N/A
The Tribe	Season 1 - Season 4 (1999 - 2002)	Channel 5
Revelations	"False Witness (2002); "The Good Samaritan (2003)	N/A

Preceded by Robert Holmes	Doctor Who script editor 1977–79	Succeeded by Douglas Adams
