= Graham Williams (television producer) =

English producer (1945–1990)

- Born: Richard Graham Williams; 24 May 1945; Birkenhead, Cheshire, England
- Died: 17 August 1990 (aged 45); Bolham, Devon, England
- Occupations: Television producer, script editor
- Spouse: Jacqueline Williams
- Children: 3

Richard Graham Williams (24 May 1945 – 17 August 1990) was an English television producer, script editor and screenwriter. He produced three seasons of the BBC science fiction television series Doctor Who during Tom Baker's era as the Fourth Doctor, the ITV children's series Super Gran (1986–1987), and thirteen episodes of Tales of the Unexpected (1982–1984).

== Early work ==
After working as the script editor for The View From Daniel Pike (1971), Sutherland's Law (1973), Barlow at Large (1975) and Z-Cars (1975–1976), he was encouraged by Bill Slater, then BBC Head of Serials, to move to production. He created a new police series for the BBC, which became Target, but the corporation's management decided to take him off it at an early stage and charged him with taking over Doctor Who in 1977, swapping roles with Philip Hinchcliffe.

== Doctor Who ==
Williams was the producer on Doctor Who between 1977 and 1980, during the Tom Baker era. Under Philip Hinchcliffe, the series had "reached an almost unprecedented level of popularity", but also come under heavy criticism for its frightening and violent content, especially from Mary Whitehouse. Upon taking over the reins of the series, Williams was instructed by his superiors to tone down the violence. Williams himself thought Hinchcliffe had gone too far for a series that had a large audience of children, but said the BBC had been guilty of an overreaction in response. One of the notable early introductions to the series under the Williams tenure was the robot dog K9, which was part of his effort to aim the series more at younger viewers. Williams was also keen to introduce more humour into the series.

During his period on the programme, Williams worked closely with three script editors: Hinchcliffe-era script editor Robert Holmes continued with Williams for a short while, but was succeeded by Anthony Read in his first season. Read remained as script editor for the following season, also known as the Key to Time, which introduced the character of Romana (Mary Tamm), but Douglas Adams (now best known for The Hitchhiker's Guide to the Galaxy) took over the role for his final year, season 17, which saw Lalla Ward replace Tamm as the regenerated Romana. Williams also wrote significant portions of the scripts for two stories beset by writing problems, The Invasion of Time (1978) and City of Death (1979). Although the viewing figures dipped somewhat during Williams' first two seasons, they remained healthy and in 1979 the series achieved its highest ever ratings of 16.1 million viewers (for episode 4 of City of Death), although this was partly attributable to the strike which took the BBC's then-only rival, ITV, off the air.

Williams had three difficult years on the show, including clashes with the increasingly demanding Baker, who wanted more influence over the production side, and also had to deal with budget cuts due to inflation and several instances of industrial action affecting the show, most notably with the abandonment of his final serial, Shada. He decided to leave in 1979, handing over the role of producer to John Nathan-Turner, who had worked under him as production unit manager.

During Nathan-Turner's reign as producer, Williams was approached by script editor Eric Saward at Nathan-Turner's instigation to write a story for Colin Baker's second season. The script was at an advanced stage when it was abandoned, as were all the scripts initially commissioned for that season, after the series was put on hiatus in February 1985. It was to feature the return of the First Doctor villain the Celestial Toymaker. In 1989 Williams wrote a novelisation of his story, The Nightmare Fair (ISBN 0-426-20334-8).

In 1985, he helped design the Doctor Who text video game Doctor Who and the Warlord.

His work on Doctor Who was first documented for television in the 2007 documentary A Matter of Time (part of the 2007 The Key to Time BBC DVD box set). In March 2024, a feature-length documentary titled Darkness & Light: The Life of Graham Williams examined his life and career in extensive detail. Released as part of The Collection: Season 15 Blu-ray box set, it features interviews with family, close friends and colleagues, and publicly confirmed that his death was a result of suicide. Both documentaries includes excerpts from interviews conducted with Williams conducted at Doctor Who fan conventions during the 1980s.

== Later life and death ==
Graham departed the BBC during the early 1980s, going on to produce Tales of the Unexpected for Anglia and the second series of Tyne Tees children's series Super Gran. He left his career in television behind in the late 1980s to run The Hartnoll Hotel, a country hotel in Bolham, Tiverton, Devon.

He died by suicide from a gunshot wound at his home on 17 August 1990. He left a widow, Jacqueline, and three children.

Preceded by Philip Hinchcliffe	Doctor Who Producer; 1977–80	Succeeded by John Nathan-Turner
