= The Robots of Death =

090 – The Robots of Death
- Doctor Who serial
- DVD cover for the Special Edition of The Robots of Death

Cast
- Doctor: Tom Baker – Fourth Doctor
- Companion: Louise Jameson – Leela
- Others: Russell Hunter – Uvanov; Pamela Salem – Toos; David Bailie – Dask/Taren Capel; David Collings – Poul; Brian Croucher – Borg; Tania Rogers – Zilda; Rob Edwards – Chub; Tariq Yunus – Cass; Gregory de Polnay – D.84; Miles Fothergill – S.V.7; Mark Blackwell Baker, John Bleasdale, Mark Cooper, Peter Langtry, Jeremy Ranchev, Richard Seager – Robots

Production
- Directed by: Michael E. Briant
- Written by: Chris Boucher
- Script editor: Robert Holmes
- Produced by: Philip Hinchcliffe
- Executive producer: None
- Music by: Dudley Simpson
- Production code: 4R
- Series: Season 14
- Running time: 4 episodes, 25 minutes each
- First broadcast: 29 January 1977
- Last broadcast: 19 February 1977

Chronology
← Preceded by The Face of Evil	Followed by → The Talons of Weng-Chiang

The Robots of Death is the fifth serial of the 14th season of the British science fiction television series Doctor Who, which was first broadcast in four weekly parts on BBC1 from 29 January to 19 February 1977.

In the serial, the Fourth Doctor (Tom Baker) and Leela (Louise Jameson) arrive on a sandminer whose crew, from a robot-dependent civilisation, are being murdered.

Influenced by the works of Agatha Christie, Isaac Asimov and Frank Herbert, The Robots of Death was the second script written for the series by Chris Boucher, Philip Hinchcliffe's penultimate story as producer, and Michael E. Briant's final contribution to the series as a director. It has been described by Radio Times as a "fan favourite", "suspenseful" and "beautifully designed" serial featuring Tom Baker "in his prime". It was chosen to represent the era of the Fourth Doctor at the British Film Institute's 50th anniversary celebration of Doctor Who.

== Plot ==
The Fourth Doctor and Leela arrive in the TARDIS inside "Storm Mine 4", a large sand-crawling mining vehicle used to gather valuable minerals that are brought to the surface of a desert planet by powerful sandstorms. They find the vehicle has a minimal human crew that oversee the menial work done by numerous robots, which are divided into three classes: dark-green-coloured "Dum" robots that cannot speak, gold-green-coloured "Voc" robots that can interact with the human crew, and a silver-coloured "Super Voc" robot, SV7, who manages the other robots.

The Doctor and Leela arrived shortly after the discovery of the corpse of one of the human crew, meteorologist Chub, recently murdered. The Doctor offers to help to find the murderer and prove their innocence. During the search, Leela comes across D84, a Dum who is secretly a Super Voc who is able to speak. The investigation is cut short when two more of the crew, Kerrill and Cass, are found killed, and the Doctor and Leela are secured in the robot repair section. However, crew member Poul is doubtful of the Doctor's or Leela's involvement, and when Poul finds Commander Uvanov standing over the corpse of yet another victim, he allows them to go free, convinced that Uvanov was guilty.

The vehicle's engines go out of control, threatening the crew, and they find the ship's engineer Borg appears to be another murder victim. The Doctor helps to regulate the engines to get them out of danger, while an engineer called Dask stays behind to repair the damage to the controls. The Doctor and Leela continue to investigate the murders, with the Doctor convinced one of the robots is behind it. Leela takes him to meet D84, and D84 explains that he and Poul were planted on the vehicle as a precautionary measure against a robot revolution that may be initiated by Taren Capel, a scientist that had been raised by robots and with delusions of power. D84 joins them to search the vehicle, and they discover a secret laboratory where the other robots have been reprogrammed to kill humans. Suspecting that Taren is aboard, the Doctor requests all the humans to meet them on the bridge. Poul, however, having discovered a damaged robot in the repair shop with a bloody left hand, realizes that the robots are responsible for the murders, goes mad, and shelters in the shop.

However, Dask refuses, and reveals himself as Taren; he shuts down all of the robots except those he had reprogrammed (excluding D84), and orders SV7 to start hunting down the remaining humans. As D84 retrieves Poul, the Doctor and Leela return to the robot repair section, and find the damaged robot with Borg's blood on it; the Doctor surmises that Borg had been strong enough to put up a struggle against his robot assassin, and that this discovery had driven Poul insane. The Doctor uses the spare parts to construct a deactivator that will shut down all robots in close range, and then instructs Leela to hide with a canister of helium gas to use when Taren returns.

Taren is lured to the laboratory by the Doctor and D84, however D84 sacrifices himself to use the deactivator to shut down the Voc guard in the laboratory and itself. When SV7 arrives to kill the remaining humans, Taren begins to give SV7 orders to kill the Doctor, but the helium released by Leela causes Taren's voice to become high-pitched and unrecognisable by SV7. The Super Voc then kills him. The Doctor helps to shut down SV7 and revert Taren's programming. After ensuring that Poul and the others are safe and help is on the way, the Doctor and Leela take their leave.

== Production ==
Early titles for the script included Planet of the Robots and The Storm-mine Murders.

The treatment of robots in this serial has many intentional nods to Isaac Asimov's Three Laws of Robotics. The villain of the story is named Taren Capel, which is a reference to Karel Čapek, who is credited with first coining the word "robot". Uvanov's name is a reference to Isaac Asimov, while Poul is a reference to the science fiction writer Poul Anderson. The script several times refers to Robophobia (the irrational fear of robots) as 'Grimwade's Syndrome', an inside joke reference to Peter Grimwade, a production assistant who directed some of the filmed scenes in the episode. Grimwade had frequently lamented that he was always working on material involving robots.

The sandminer was derived from Dune.

=== Cast notes ===
Russell Hunter was allegedly cast against the intention of the script, which implied that Commander Uvanov should be a physically imposing man, much in the mould of an eighteenth-century sailing master. David Collings, who plays Poul, previously appeared as Vorus in Revenge of the Cybermen and would later appear as Mawdryn in Mawdryn Undead as well as an alternative incarnation of the Doctor in the Big Finish Productions' Doctor Who Unbound audio drama Full Fathom Five. Pamela Salem, who plays Toos, had provided voice work in the preceding story The Face of Evil and would later appear as Professor Rachel Jensen in Remembrance of the Daleks. Salem had been one of the actresses considered for the part of Leela. David Bailie went on to play the Celestial Toymaker in the audio plays The Nightmare Fair and Solitaire.

== Broadcast and reception ==
Episode	Title	Run time	Original release date	UK viewers (millions)
1	"Part One"	24:06	29 January 1977	12.8
2	"Part Two"	24:15	5 February 1977	12.4
3	"Part Three"	23:51	12 February 1977	13.1
4	"Part Four"	23:42	19 February 1977	12.6

Episodes 1 & 2 and Episodes 3 & 4 were combined into two 50-minute episodes for repeat on 31 December 1977 and 1 January 1978, reaching 10.0 and 7.0 million viewers respectively.

Paul Cornell, Martin Day, and Keith Topping, in The Discontinuity Guide (1995), called the script "one of the best ever" and praised how it was enhanced by the design, acting, and direction. In The Television Companion (1998), David J. Howe and Stephen James Walker expressed similar praise, describing it as a "true classic" and praising the Art Deco design. In 2010, Mark Braxton of Radio Times observed a few production errors but overall praised the design and voices of the robots and the score. He also called the story "extraordinary", despite there being a coldness between Baker and Jameson that made it to the screen. DVD Talk's Ian Jane was less positive, giving the story three and a half out of five stars. He found the plot "a fairly standard murder mystery" but still "a good amount of fun", and praised Baker and Jameson. Charlie Jane Anders of io9 recommended The Robots of Death, remarking that "it might be becoming my favorite classic Doctor Who story". In Doctor Who: The Complete Guide, Mark Campbell awarded it ten out of ten, writing "fabulous design work, hugely suspenseful music and a very believable scenario make this one of the programme's most durable tales. The killer may be obvious, but the tension is wrung out to the bitter end."

In his book Design for Doctor Who: Vision and Revision in Screen Science Fiction, Piers D. Britton called the design "sumptuous", with strong silhouettes in the costumes designed by Elizabeth Waller, and a wealth of detail in the art direction.

== Commercial releases ==
=== In print ===
Doctor Who and the Robots of Death
- Author: Terrance Dicks
- Cover artist: John Geary
- Series: Doctor Who book: Target novelisations
- Release number: 53
- Publisher: Target Books
- Publication date: 24 May 1979
- ISBN: 0-426-20061-6

A novelisation of this serial, written by Terrance Dicks, was published by Target Books in May 1979. This novelisation was the shortest and notable for featuring the character of Cass attending a meeting after being murdered in the previous chapter.

=== Home media ===
This story was released on VHS in omnibus format in April 1986 and in episodic format in February 1995. It was released on DVD on 13 November 2000. A special edition of the DVD, with new bonus features, was released in the UK on 13 February 2012 in the third of the ongoing Revisitations DVD box sets.
