= Doctor Who season 14 =

1976–77 season of British sci-fi TV series

Doctor Who
- Season 14
- Cover art of the Blu-ray release for the complete season
- Starring: Tom Baker; Elisabeth Sladen; Louise Jameson
- No. of stories: 6
- No. of episodes: 26

Release
- Original network: BBC1
- Original release: 4 September 1976 – 2 April 1977

Season chronology
- ← Previous; Season 13 Next → Season 15

The fourteenth season of British science fiction television series Doctor Who began on 4 September 1976 with The Masque of Mandragora, and ended with The Talons of Weng-Chiang. The third Fourth Doctor series, it was the final series of Philip Hinchcliffe's production, whilst Robert Holmes stayed till The Sun Makers in the next series.

== Casting ==
=== Main cast ===
- Tom Baker as the Fourth Doctor
- Elisabeth Sladen as Sarah Jane Smith
- Louise Jameson as Leela

Tom Baker continues his role as the Fourth Doctor. Sarah Jane Smith (Elisabeth Sladen) departs in The Hand of Fear, before the Doctor is joined by Leela (Louise Jameson) in The Face of Evil. Uniquely in the 'classic' era of Doctor Who, no companion appears in The Deadly Assassin.

=== Guest stars ===
The Master reappears in The Deadly Assassin as the main antagonist, his first appearance since Frontier in Space (1973), this time played by Peter Pratt. The character would not make a further appearance until five years later in 1981.

== Serials ==
The Masque of Mandragora saw the debut of the new wood-panelled "Secondary Console Room" set, which was to be used as the main TARDIS console room throughout the season. The season took a five-week transmission break between the broadcasts of The Deadly Assassin and The Face of Evil in order to extend the season further into 1977, allowing Robert Holmes time to work on the final serial The Talons of Weng-Chiang.

No. story	No. in season	Serial title	Episode titles	Directed by	Written by	Original release date	Prod. code	UK viewers (millions)	AI
86	1	The Masque of Mandragora	"Part One"	Rodney Bennett	Louis Marks	4 September 1976	4M	8.3	58
86	1	The Masque of Mandragora	"Part Two"	Rodney Bennett	Louis Marks	11 September 1976	4M	9.8	56
86	1	The Masque of Mandragora	"Part Three"	Rodney Bennett	Louis Marks	18 September 1976	4M	9.2	—
86	1	The Masque of Mandragora	"Part Four"	Rodney Bennett	Louis Marks	25 September 1976	4M	10.6	56
An encounter with the living energy structure known as the Mandragora Helix leads the TARDIS to 15th century Italy.
87	2	The Hand of Fear	"Part One"	Lennie Mayne	Bob Baker and Dave Martin	2 October 1976	4N	10.5	—
87	2	The Hand of Fear	"Part Two"	Lennie Mayne	Bob Baker and Dave Martin	9 October 1976	4N	10.2	—
87	2	The Hand of Fear	"Part Three"	Lennie Mayne	Bob Baker and Dave Martin	16 October 1976	4N	11.1	62
87	2	The Hand of Fear	"Part Four"	Lennie Mayne	Bob Baker and Dave Martin	23 October 1976	4N	12.0	—
The Fourth Doctor and Sarah Jane are caught in a mining explosion. Sarah Jane is found clutching what appears to be a fossilised hand, buried in a 150-million-year-old stratum.
88	3	The Deadly Assassin	"Part One"	David Maloney	Robert Holmes	30 October 1976	4P	11.8	—
88	3	The Deadly Assassin	"Part Two"	David Maloney	Robert Holmes	6 November 1976	4P	12.1	59
88	3	The Deadly Assassin	"Part Three"	David Maloney	Robert Holmes	13 November 1976	4P	13.0	—
88	3	The Deadly Assassin	"Part Four"	David Maloney	Robert Holmes	20 November 1976	4P	11.8	61
The Doctor goes to Gallifrey to prevent a precognitive vision; and fights his way to a conspicuous sniper rifle, but the assassin shoots the President dead from the crowd. He realises that it was the Master who had sent him the vision through the Matrix; he enters the Matrix, confronts an assassin who reveals himself as Chancellor Goth; the Master tries to trap the Doctor, but he escapes. He arrives in their chamber, and find the Master pulse-less and Goth fatally burnt and dying. The Doctor finds that the President has access to the Sash and Great Key of Rassilon, and the Doctor realises that the Eye of Harmony is actually a black hole's nucleus, and the Sash and Key its control devices. He also realises that the Master used a neural inhibitor that mimics a deathlike state. The Master makes his way to the Eye, and the two fight, until the Master loses his footing and falls into a chasm. As the Doctor's TARDIS dematerialises, the Master sneaks into his own TARDIS and escapes.
89	4	The Face of Evil	"Part One"	Pennant Roberts	Chris Boucher	1 January 1977	4Q	10.7	61
89	4	The Face of Evil	"Part Two"	Pennant Roberts	Chris Boucher	8 January 1977	4Q	11.1	—
89	4	The Face of Evil	"Part Three"	Pennant Roberts	Chris Boucher	15 January 1977	4Q	11.3	59
89	4	The Face of Evil	"Part Four"	Pennant Roberts	Chris Boucher	22 January 1977	4Q	11.7	60
The Doctor arrives on a planet where two tribes are at war and discovers that their god of evil is him.
90	5	The Robots of Death	"Part One"	Michael E. Briant	Chris Boucher	29 January 1977	4R	12.8	62
90	5	The Robots of Death	"Part Two"	Michael E. Briant	Chris Boucher	5 February 1977	4R	12.4	—
90	5	The Robots of Death	"Part Three"	Michael E. Briant	Chris Boucher	12 February 1977	4R	13.1	—
90	5	The Robots of Death	"Part Four"	Michael E. Briant	Chris Boucher	19 February 1977	4R	12.6	57
A vessel is commanded by a crew of indolent or avaricious human staff. It is a happy partnership until the human crew start being murdered one by one.
91	6	The Talons of Weng-Chiang	"Part One"	David Maloney	Robert Holmes	26 February 1977	4S	11.3	—
91	6	The Talons of Weng-Chiang	"Part Two"	David Maloney	Robert Holmes	5 March 1977	4S	9.8	—
91	6	The Talons of Weng-Chiang	"Part Three"	David Maloney	Robert Holmes	12 March 1977	4S	10.2	—
91	6	The Talons of Weng-Chiang	"Part Four"	David Maloney	Robert Holmes	19 March 1977	4S	11.4	60
91	6	The Talons of Weng-Chiang	"Part Five"	David Maloney	Robert Holmes	26 March 1977	4S	10.1	—
91	6	The Talons of Weng-Chiang	"Part Six"	David Maloney	Robert Holmes	2 April 1977	4S	9.3	58
The Doctor and Leela travel to Victorian London where they encounter a sinister Chinese stage magician and his master, a fugitive from the 51st century.

== Production ==
=== Scrapped stories ===
Multiple stories were scrapped during production of this season. Douglas Camfield's The Lost Legion would have seen the Doctor and Sarah in North Africa at an isolated French Legion outpost while caught between an alien conflict, and was planned to write out Sarah Jane. It was later removed from production.The Gaslight Murders was written by Basil Dawson and would have introduced a Cockney girl to replace to Sarah Jane Smith as a companion that the Doctor would have taken under his wing and educated. Ultimately, it was replaced by The Face of Evil. The Dreamers of Phados and The Mentor Conspiracy were two script proposals from Chris Boucher, though both ultimately got scrapped after being commissioned to write The Face of Evil. The Foe from the Future was planned to be written by Robert Banks Stewart, but ultimately was scrapped and replaced by The Talons of Weng-Chiang due to Stewart becoming the script editor of Armchair Thriller and being unable to deliver the scripts.

== Broadcast ==
The entire season was broadcast from 4 September 1976 to 2 April 1977, but with a six week break mid-season between the third and fourth serials from 20 November 1976 to 1 January 1977.

== Home media ==
=== VHS releases ===
Season	Story no.	Serial name	Duration	Release date		
Season	Story no.	Serial name	Duration	UK	Australia	USA / Canada
14	86	The Masque of Mandragora	4 × 25 min.	August 1991	October 1992	February 1994
14	87	The Hand of Fear	4 × 25 min.	February 1996	May 1997	February 1997
14	88	The Deadly Assassin	4 × 25 min.	October 1991	March 1992	—N/a
14	88	The Deadly Assassin	1 × 100 min.	—N/a	—N/a	March 1989
14	89	The Face of Evil	4 × 25 min	May 1999	June 1999	March 2000
14	90	The Robots of Death	1 × 100 min	February 1988	March 1988	July 1987
14	90	The Robots of Death	4 × 25 min	February 1995	—N/a	—N/a
14	91	The Talons of Weng-Chiang	1 × 150 min.	November 1988	April 1987	February 1988

=== Betamax releases ===
Season	Story no.	Serial name	Duration	Release date		
Season	Story no.	Serial name	Duration	UK	Australia	USA / Canada
14	90	The Robots of Death	1 × 100 min	April 1986	—N/a	—N/a

=== DVD and Blu-ray releases ===
All releases are for DVD unless otherwise indicated:

- ^{(B)} indicates a Blu-ray release

Season	Story no.	Serial name	Duration	Release date		
Season	Story no.	Serial name	Duration	R2	R4	R1
14	86	The Masque of Mandragora	4 × 25 min.	8 February 2010	5 May 2010	4 May 2010
14	87	The Hand of Fear	4 × 25 min.	24 July 2006	7 September 2006	7 November 2006
14	88	The Deadly Assassin	4 × 25 min.	11 May 2009	2 July 2009	1 September 2009
14	89	The Face of Evil	4 × 25 min.	5 March 2012	5 April 2012	13 March 2012
14	90	The Robots of Death	4 × 25 min.	13 November 2000	2 July 2001	6 September 2001
14	90	The Robots of Death (Special Edition) (Note: Only available as part of the Revisitations 3 box set in Regions 2 and 4. Only available individually in Region 1.)	4 × 25 min.	13 February 2012	1 March 2012	13 March 2012
14	91	The Talons of Weng-Chiang	6 × 25 min.	28 April 2003	30 June 2003	7 October 2003
14	91	The Talons of Weng-Chiang (Special Edition) (Note: Only available as part of the Revisitations 1 box set in Regions 2 and 4. Only available individually in Region 1.)	6 × 25 min.	4 October 2010	2 December 2010	11 October 2011
14	86–91	Complete Season 14 (Note: Released as Doctor Who: The Collection – Season 14 in Region B. Released as Doctor Who – Tom Baker: Complete Season Three in Region A.)	26 × 25 min.	4 May 2020 ^{(B)}	15 July 2020 ^{(B)}	4 August 2020 ^{(B)}

== In print ==
Season	Story no.	Library no. (Note: Number in Target's Doctor Who Library, if applicable)	Novelisation title	Author	Hardcover release date (Note: Published by Target's parent companies (Allen Wingate, W. H. Allen, BBC Books) unless otherwise indicated)	Paperback release date (Note: Published by Target Books (or by BBC Books under the Target Collection umbrella) unless otherwise indicated)	Audiobook	
Season	Story no.	Library no.	Novelisation title	Author	Hardcover release date	Paperback release date	Release date (Note: Unabridged from BBC Audio / AudioGo unless otherwise indicated)	Narrator
14	086	42	Doctor Who and the Masque of Mandragora	Philip Hinchcliffe	19 January 1978	8 December 1977	9 April 2009	Tim Pigott-Smith
14	087	30	Doctor Who and the Hand of Fear	Terrance Dicks	18 January 1979		7 January 2021	Pamela Salem
14	088	19	Doctor Who and the Deadly Assassin	Terrance Dicks	20 October 1977		19 March 2015	Geoffrey Beevers
14	089	25	Doctor Who and the Face of Evil	Terrance Dicks	19 January 1978		19 January 2011 (Note: Published by the Royal National Institute of the Blind)	Louise Jameson
14	089	25	Doctor Who and the Face of Evil	Terrance Dicks	19 January 1978		7 April 2022	Louise Jameson
14	090	53	Doctor Who and the Robots of Death	Terrance Dicks	24 May 1979		1 February 2018	Louise Jameson
14	091	61	Doctor Who and the Talons of Weng-Chiang	Terrance Dicks	17 November 1977		1 January 2013	Christopher Benjamin
