= The Masque of Mandragora =

086 – The Masque of Mandragora
- Doctor Who serial

Cast
- Doctor: Tom Baker – Fourth Doctor
- Companion: Elisabeth Sladen – Sarah Jane Smith
- Others: Jon Laurimore – Count Federico; Gareth Armstrong – Giuliano; Tim Pigott-Smith – Marco; Norman Jones – Hieronymous; Robert James – High Priest; Brian Ellis – Brother; Antony Carrick – Rossini; Pat Gorman – Soldier; Jay Neill, Peter Walshe – Pikemen; James Appleby, John Clamp – Guards; Peter Tuddenham – Voice; Peggy Dixon, Jack Edwards, Alistair Fullarton, Michael Reid, Kathy Wolff – Dancers; Stuart Fell – Entertainer

Production
- Directed by: Rodney Bennett
- Written by: Louis Marks
- Script editor: Robert Holmes
- Produced by: Philip Hinchcliffe
- Executive producer: None
- Music by: Dudley Simpson
- Production code: 4M
- Series: Season 14
- Running time: 4 episodes, 25 minutes each
- First broadcast: 4 September 1976
- Last broadcast: 25 September 1976

Chronology
← Preceded by The Seeds of Doom	Followed by → The Hand of Fear

The Masque of Mandragora is the first serial of the 14th season of the British science fiction television series Doctor Who, which was first broadcast in four weekly parts on BBC1 from 4 to 25 September 1976.

The serial is set in the fictional European duchy of San Martino in the late 15th century. In the serial, the astrologer Hieronymous (Norman Jones) seeks to summon the power of an intelligence called the Mandragora Helix to rule the Earth.

== Plot ==
During a tour of the TARDIS, the Doctor and Sarah Jane Smith are sucked into the Mandragora Helix, a swirl of living energy. While they successfully escape, a fragment of the Helix follows them, bringing them to the 15th century Italian duchy of San Martino. There, Count Frederico and court astrologer Hieronymous covertly kill the former's brother, the Duke, in a bid for power. Hieronymous clashes with Federico's science-minded nephew, Giuliano, who Frederico conspires to kill to prevent his succession to the throne.

Sarah is caught by a pagan cult while the Doctor is apprehended by Federico's forces. The Doctor unsuccessfully tries to warn the duchy of the Helix and is sentenced to death, but escapes. He finds Sarah and rescues her from a sacrifice attempt by the cultists. Their leader is revealed to be Hieronymous, who bargains with the Helix fragment for godlike powers. The Doctor and Sarah are caught by Giuliano's forces; the Doctor befriends Giuliano and deduces that the fragment picked this location due to the cult giving it a ready power base. The trio return to the temple to destroy it; the Doctor is attacked by the fragment, Frederico's guards attack Giuliano, and Sarah is caught by the cult while looking for the Doctor.

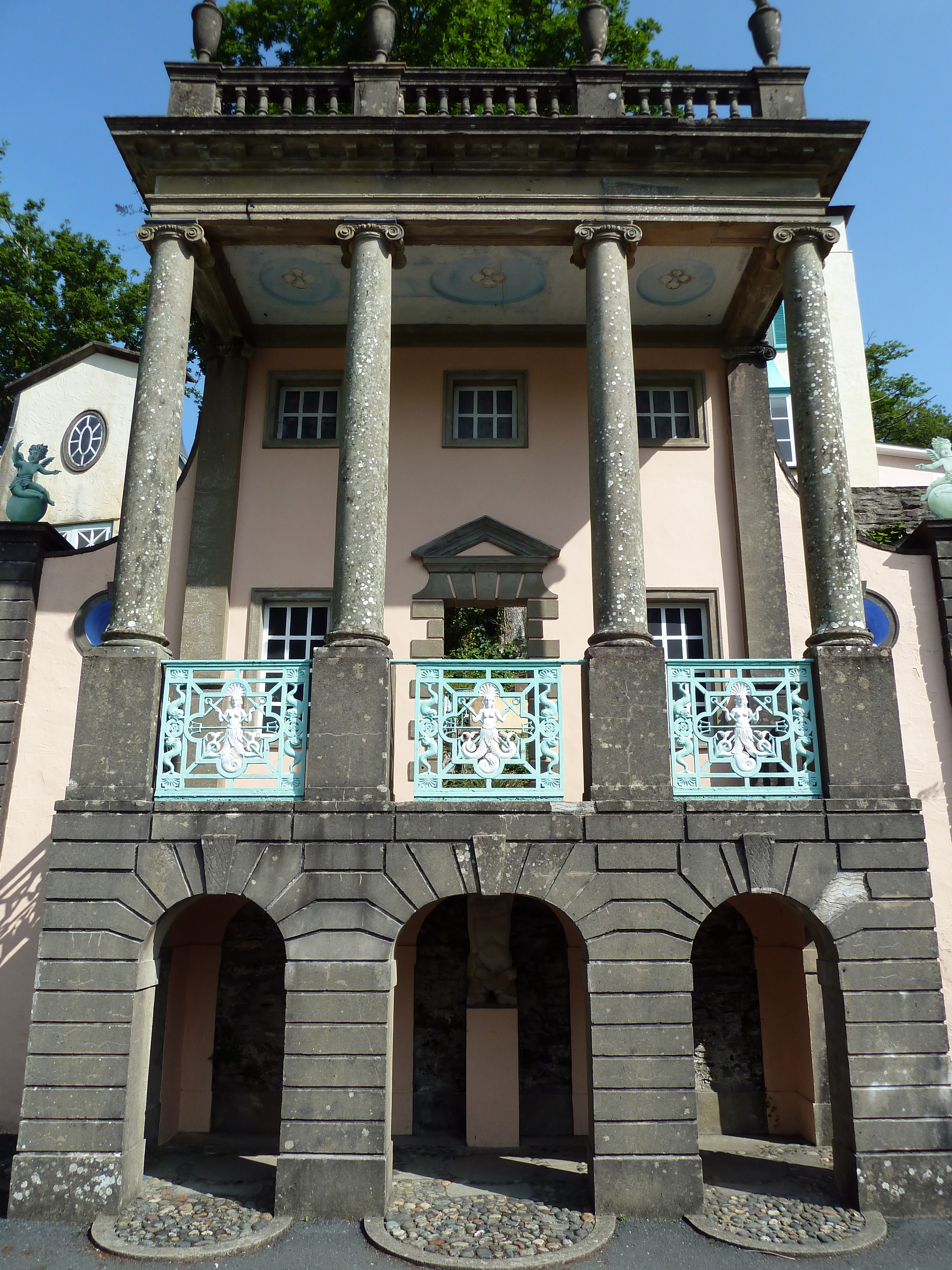
The Gloriette in Portmeirion used as the location for the palace courtyard where the Doctor was to be executed

The Doctor recovers and saves Giuliano, while Hieronymous hypnotizes Sarah to assassinate the Doctor. She is returned to the Doctor and tries to attack him during a confrontation with Hieronymous, but the Doctor disarms her and breaks the hypnosis. Hieronymous escapes to the temple, where Frederico confronts him; Hieronymous reveals that his body has been absorbed by the fragment, leaving only energy, and kills Frederico before plotting a coup during an oncoming masque. The Doctor convinces Giuliano not to cancel it and returns to the temple, tying wire around the altar and defending himself from Hieronymous' attacks with a breast plate.

The cult breach the palace and attack the masque, killing many, but Hieronymous seemingly appears and demands that the survivors instead be sacrificed. At the temple, the cultists suddenly die and the fragment is expelled from Earth thanks to the Doctor's wire. "Hieronymous" turns out to be the Doctor impersonating him; the real Hieronymous similarly perished during the pair's fight. The Doctor and Sarah part ways with Giuliano, while the Doctor estimates that the Mandragora Helix will attack Earth again around the end of the 20th century.

== Production ==
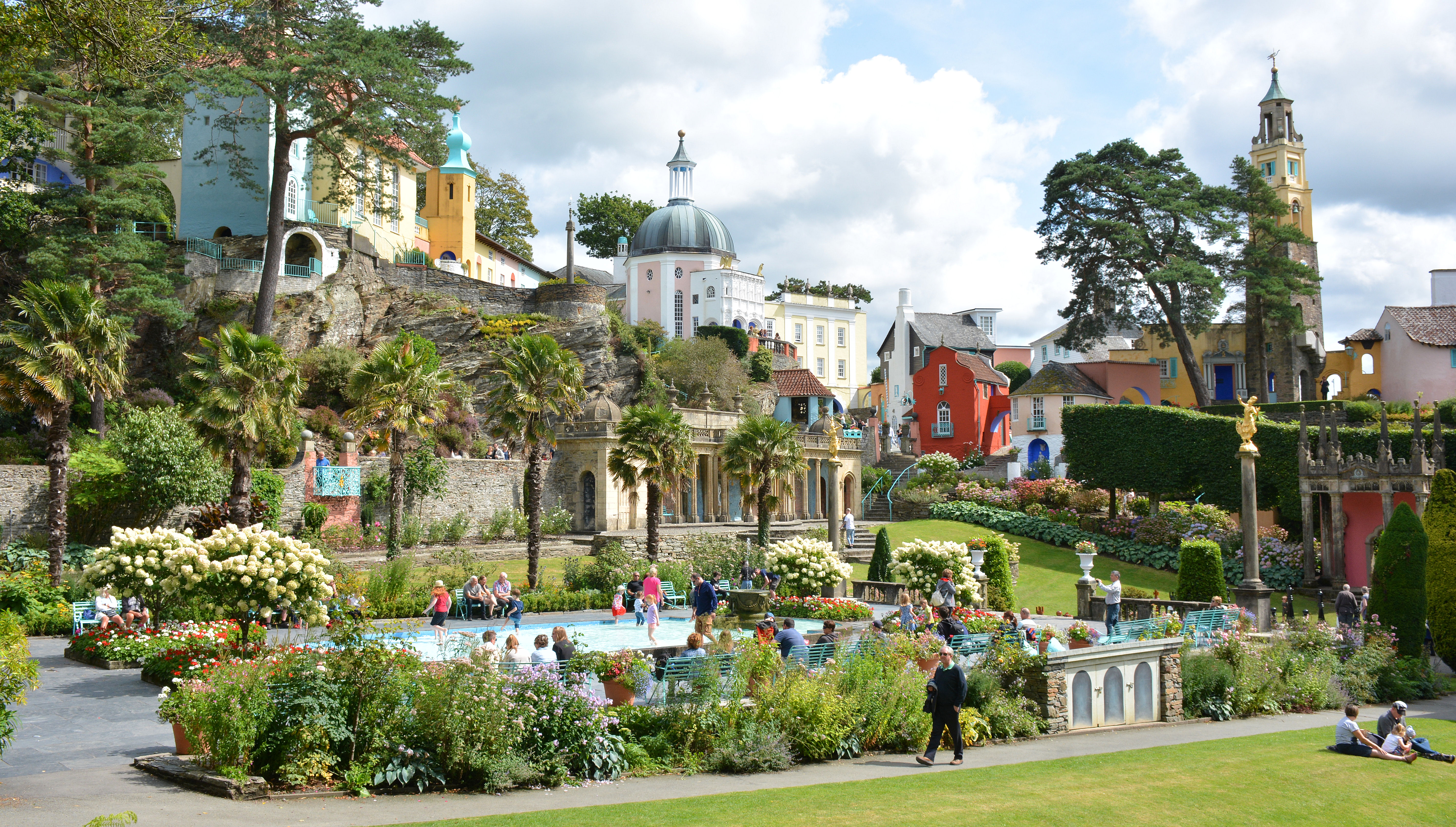
Portmeirion, where location shooting for the serial took place

Working titles for this story included The Catacombs of Death and The Curse of Mandragora. The ultimate name references the masque, entertainment performed by masked players, that later plays a key role in the plot.

Location shooting for the serial was done at the resort of Portmeirion in Wales, better known as the setting for the cult series The Prisoner.

=== Cast notes ===
Tim Pigott-Smith previously played Captain Harker in The Claws of Axos (1971). Norman Jones previously played Khrisong in The Abominable Snowmen (1967) and Major Baker in Doctor Who and the Silurians (1970). Robert James had previously played Lesterson in The Power of the Daleks (1966).

== Themes and analysis ==
Martin Wiggins, senior lecturer and fellow at the Shakespeare Institute at Stratford-upon-Avon, has compared this story's plot with Hamlet: "It has an inexperienced, intellectual prince, a usurping duke, and a debate about the conflict between science and religion that recalls Hamlet's musings on the nature of the supernatural world."

The episode contributes to the "myth of the flat Earth" when Giuliano says he is entertaining a new, revolutionary notion that the Earth is round. In fact, educated Europeans had already universally accepted the roundness of the Earth before the 15th century.

== Broadcast and reception ==
Episode	Title	Run time	Original release date	UK viewers (millions)
1	"Part One"	24:31	4 September 1976	8.3
2	"Part Two"	24:44	11 September 1976	9.8
3	"Part Three"	24:34	18 September 1976	9.2
4	"Part Four"	24:45	25 September 1976	10.6

Paul Cornell, Martin Day, and Keith Topping wrote of the serial in The Discontinuity Guide (1995), "One of the few metaphors in Doctor Who history (nasty alien energy mass = superstition and scientific ignorance) is blurred by the lack of actual scientific understanding that the story exhibits. Looks and sounds great, though." In The Television Companion (1998), David J. Howe and Stephen James Walker reported that viewers had a mixed reaction to the serial, according to the BBC's Audience Research Report, but there had been a majority of "moderate approval". Howe and Walker themselves commended the "very well written and highly intelligent" scripts, the "polished production", and strong cast. In 2010, Patrick Mulkern of Radio Times described the serial as "polished" with "an air of confidence in the writing and performances". He praised the masked ball ending and the costumes and music, and remarked that "perhaps the only feeble note is the representation of the Helix". DVD Talk's Ian Jane gave The Masque of Mandragora three and a half out of five stars, calling it "pretty entertaining stuff". While he felt that "it's a bit predictable and most of the supporting cast is surprisingly poorly defined", he praised Baker and the atmosphere of the serial and wrote that ultimately the good outweighs the bad.

== Commercial releases ==
=== In print ===
Doctor Who and the Masque of Mandragora
- Author: Philip Hinchcliffe
- Cover artist: Mike Little
- Series: Doctor Who book: Target novelisations
- Release number: 42
- Publisher: Target Books
- Publication date: 8 December 1977
- ISBN: 0-426-11893-6

A novelisation of this serial, written by Philip Hinchcliffe, was published by Target Books in December 1977. A French translation of it was published in 1987. An unabridged reading of the novelisation read by Tim Pigott-Smith was released by BBC Audiobooks in April 2009.

=== Home media ===
This story was released on VHS in August 1991, on DVD on 8 February 2010, and as part of the Season 14 Collection on Blu-ray on 4 May 2020. This serial was also released as part of the Doctor Who DVD Files in issue 64 on 15 June 2011.
