= Chris Boucher =

Chris Boucher may refer to:

- Chris Boucher (basketball) (born 1993), Saint Lucian-born Canadian basketball player
- Chris Boucher (writer) (1943–2022), British writer
