= Fourth Doctor =

Fictional British TV character

The Doctor
The Fourth Doctor
- Doctor Who character
- Tom Baker as the Fourth Doctor
- First regular appearance: Robot (1974–1975)
- Last regular appearance: Logopolis (1981)
- Introduced by: Barry Letts
- Portrayed by: Tom Baker
- Preceded by: Jon Pertwee (Third Doctor)
- Succeeded by: Peter Davison (Fifth Doctor)

Information
- Tenure: 28 December 1974 – 21 March 1981
- No of series: 7
- Appearances: 41 stories (172 episodes)
- Companions: Sarah Jane Smith; Harry Sullivan; Leela; K9; Romana; Adric; Nyssa; Tegan Jovanka
- Chronology: Season 12 (1974–1975); Season 13 (1975–1976); Season 14 (1976–1977); Season 15 (1977–1978); Season 16 (1978–1979); Season 17 (1979–1980); Season 18 (1980–1981); Season 20 (1983)

The Fourth Doctor is an incarnation of the Doctor, the protagonist of the British science fiction television series Doctor Who. He is portrayed by Tom Baker.

Within the series' narrative, the Doctor is a centuries-old alien Time Lord from the planet Gallifrey who travels in time and space in the TARDIS, frequently with companions. At the end of life, the Doctor regenerates; as a result, the physical appearance and personality of the Doctor changes. Preceded in regeneration by the Third Doctor (Jon Pertwee), he is followed by the Fifth Doctor (Peter Davison).

Baker portrays the Fourth Doctor as a whimsical and sometimes brooding individual whose enormous personal warmth is at times tempered by his capacity for righteous anger. His initial companions were the journalist Sarah Jane Smith (Elisabeth Sladen), who had travelled with his previous incarnation, and Surgeon-Lieutenant Harry Sullivan (Ian Marter) of UNIT. His later companions were the warrior Leela (Louise Jameson), robotic dog K9 (John Leeson and David Brierly), fellow Time Lady Romana (Mary Tamm and Lalla Ward), teen mathematical genius Adric (Matthew Waterhouse), teen alien aristocrat Nyssa (Sarah Sutton), and Australian flight attendant Tegan Jovanka (Janet Fielding).

Baker portrayed the character for seven consecutive seasons, which remains the longest tenure of any actor to portray the lead, counting both the classic and new series. Baker's tenure as the Doctor is highly regarded among fans of the show and he is considered one of the icons of Seventies British culture.

== Appearances ==
=== Television ===
After contracting radiation poisoning from the crystals of the planet Metebelis 3, the Third Doctor makes his way back to UNIT headquarters in the TARDIS, where the Time Lord K'Anpo Rimpoche aids him in regenerating (Planet of the Spiders).

In his new incarnation, the Doctor is eager to leave Earth in favour of exploration, thus drawing back from continuous involvement with UNIT (with which he had worked closely as the Third Doctor). He has also grown tired of working for the Time Lords. Despite attempts to avoid them altogether, the Time Lords continue to send him on occasional missions, including an attempt to prevent the creation of the Daleks (Genesis of the Daleks), during which he also meets Davros. The Doctor travels with journalist Sarah Jane Smith, whom he had befriended prior to his regeneration, and, for a time, with UNIT Surgeon-Lieutenant Harry Sullivan.

After a battle with Zygons in Scotland, Harry (having just spent an entire season with the Doctor as they tried to get back to the TARDIS) decided that taking the train was safer than the TARDIS, which the Doctor and Sarah Jane chose to try to make an appointment in London. Instead they ended up on the planet Zeta Minor (Planet of Evil), located at the far edge of the known universe. From this point on, the Doctor and Sarah Jane travelled alone.

The Doctor's companionship with Sarah Jane came to an end when he received a telepathic summons to Gallifrey, as humans were not then allowed on the planet. The summons turns out to be part of a trap set by his enemy the Master. The renegade Time Lord has used up all his regenerations and has degenerated into little more than a withered skeletal husk. The Doctor is framed for the assassination of the President of the High Council of Time Lords and put on trial. To avoid execution, the Doctor invokes an obscure law and declares himself a candidate for the office, giving himself the time he needs to prove his innocence and expose the real culprit. This ultimately results in a climactic battle with the Master (The Deadly Assassin).

The Doctor is seen to travel alone for the first time, returning to a planet he had visited centuries before. During his previous visit, he had accidentally imprinted his own mind on a human colony ship's powerful computer, Xoanon, leaving it with multiple personalities. On his second visit the Doctor is now remembered as an evil god by the descendants of the colonists, some of whom had become a warrior tribe called the Sevateem. After the Doctor cures the computer, one of the Sevateem, Leela, joins him on his travels (The Face of Evil). The Doctor brings the intelligent but uneducated Leela to many locales in human history, teaching her about science and her own species' past. In Victorian London, the pair encounters the magician Li Hsien Chang and his master, the self-styled Weng-Chiang (The Talons of Weng-Chiang). Weng-Chiang is revealed to be a time-jumping criminal from the Earth's distant future.

Later, the Doctor and Leela visit the Bi-Al Foundation medical centre, where they acquire the robot dog K-9 (The Invisible Enemy). While K-9 is malfunctioning, a time distortion leads the TARDIS back to contemporary rural England. While investigating the distortion, he and Leela are confronted by an ancient being that feeds on death from Time Lord history, called the Fendahl (Image of the Fendahl). Eventually, the Doctor returns to Gallifrey and declares himself Lord President, based on the election held during his previous visit. This is in fact a ploy to reveal and defeat a Vardan invasion plan, which led to the unexpected consequence of leaving Gallifrey open to attack by the Sontarans (The Invasion of Time). In the aftermath Leela and K9 decide to remain on Gallifrey. The Doctor comforts himself by producing K9 Mark II.

Shortly afterward, the powerful White Guardian assigns the Doctor the task of finding the six segments of the Key to Time, sending a young female Time Lord named Romana (as portrayed by Mary Tamm) to assist him. The two Gallifreyans travel to a variety of planets, encountering strange and unusual allies and enemies, gathering the six segments and defeat the equally powerful Black Guardian, who sought the Key for himself. After the conclusion of the quest, Romana regenerates into a new form (portrayed then by Lalla Ward) (Destiny of the Daleks).

In an effort to evade the Black Guardian, the Doctor installs a "Randomiser" in the TARDIS so that not even the Black Guardian can anticipate where they go. Ironically, the first place the Randomiser sends them is the home planet of the Daleks, Skaro (Destiny of the Daleks). Perhaps because of this, the Doctor begins frequently over-riding the machine, first travelling to Paris for a holiday, only to get caught up in an alien scheme to steal the Mona Lisa (City of Death). He eventually discards the device altogether, remarking that he's fed up with not knowing where he's going.

Shortly after this, the Fourth Doctor and Romana are projected outside the known universe and into a universe of negative coordinates, known as Exo-Space. The TARDIS lands on a planet called Alzerius (Full Circle), where they are joined by a young prodigy named Adric. It's in E-Space that the Doctor destroys the last of a race of giant Vampires who had once threatened all life in his universe. Eventually, the Doctor and his two companions find themselves in a white void with no coordinates, a sort of membrane between the two universes. A way out soon forms, but Romana and K-9 choose to remain behind to help free a race of enslaved creatures in E-Space (Warriors' Gate).

The Doctor and Adric have only just made it back when they're asked to help the people of Traken from a creature known as "Melkur." On Traken, Adric and the Doctor are introduced to the aristocratic teen Nyssa of Traken. Both Nyssa and her father, Tremas, assist the Doctor in stopping Melkur, who is in fact revealed to be another TARDIS that is controlled by the Master. The Master is narrowly defeated, but manages to take over Tremas' body, thus giving himself a new incarnation.

The Doctor decides to travel to Earth to scan a real Police Box as part of a plan to repair the "Chameleon Circuit", the shape-changing mechanism in the TARDIS. However, the Doctor soon spots a mysterious ghostly figure looking at him in the distance. He eventually confronts the figure, who warns him of future dangers.

As the Doctor prepares to travel to the planet Logopolis to get the Chameleon Circuit fixed, Tegan Jovanka appears in the console room (having previously gotten lost in the corridors of the TARDIS). The conduit between E-Space and our own universe is revealed to be a Charged Vacuum Emboitment (CVE) created by the mathematicians of Logopolis as part of a system to allow the Universe to continue on past its point of heat death. Nyssa shows up, explaining that she was brought to Logopolis by the same figure that the Doctor encountered. Logopolis soon falls under the Master's control, but the stasis field he is generating ends up releasing Entropy and eroding matter throughout the universe, threatening to destroy the entire universe.

The Master agrees to help the Doctor stop the spread of Entropy by adapting the Pharos Project radio telescope on Earth so that they are able to reopen the CVEs. However, when the Master tries to take control of it, the Doctor runs out under the upturned radio dish to sever the cable linking the Master to the CVEs. The Master makes the dish start rotating so that the Doctor will fall to his death. Before he falls, he manages to tear out the cable, only to leave his companions watching as he clings to the cable. As his grip begins to slip, he sees visions of all the enemies he's faced over the years, then falls. Adric, Nyssa, and Tegan gather around the mortally wounded Doctor and call out his name. The Doctor begins seeing visions of all his companions and even the Brigadier calling his name.

He then looks up at the three of them and utters his last words: "It's the end — but the moment has been prepared for..." He then motions to the white-clad figure of the Watcher, who begins approaching the Doctor. The Watcher, a manifestation of the Doctor's future incarnation, merges with the Doctor and triggers his regeneration. "He was the Doctor all the time," remarks Nyssa, as the three watch him transform into the Fifth Doctor.

The Fourth Doctor appears again in the 20th anniversary special "The Five Doctors" (1983). A renegade Time Lord attempts to pull the first five incarnations of the Doctor out of time, inadvertently trapping the Fourth Doctor (and Romana) in a "time eddy" from which they are later freed. The Fourth Doctor also had a small cameo at the beginning of Dimensions in Time, warning his Third, Fifth, Sixth and Seventh incarnation to watch out for The Rani. Brief holographic clips of the Fourth Doctor appear in "The Next Doctor" (2008) and "The Eleventh Hour" (2010).

In the fiftieth anniversary special, "The Day of the Doctor" (2013), the Fourth Doctor appears again in clips as past and future incarnations come together to assist in the saving of Gallifrey. Tom Baker also appears in the final scene of the episode, as a mysterious elderly museum curator who appears right after the Eleventh Doctor remarks he would like to hold this job some day. He alludes to his resemblance to the Fourth Doctor by talking about revisiting "old favourite" faces and hints that he too might be or have been the Doctor.

The Fourth Doctor appeared in 172 episodes (179, counting the regeneration in Part 6 of Planet of the Spiders and his untelevised appearances in the six-part aborted serial Shada) over a seven-year period, from 1974 to 1981. This makes him the longest-running on-screen Doctor of the series.

He also appeared in the specials "The Five Doctors" (via footage from the incomplete Shada), and made his final appearance as the Doctor in the charity special Dimensions in Time (aside from a series of television advertisements in New Zealand in 1997).

=== Other mentions ===
Visions of the Fourth Doctor appear in the Fifth Doctor serials Earthshock (1982), Mawdryn Undead (1983) and Resurrection of the Daleks (1984), and in the 21st century series in the episodes "The Next Doctor", "The Eleventh Hour", "The Lodger", "Nightmare in Silver", "The Magician's Apprentice", "Twice Upon a Time", "The Timeless Children", "Rogue", "The Story & The Engine", "Wish World" and "The Reality War". His voice is also used in "The Almost People". The Fourth Doctor also appears in Sarah Jane's flashback in The Mad Woman in the Attic, via footage taken from The Hand of Fear. Similar flashbacks appear in The Sarah Jane Adventures story Death of the Doctor. In "The Name of the Doctor," he is seen briefly by Clara Oswald wandering around the TARDIS (clip taken from The Invasion of Time). He was also seen as an echo running past Clara inside the Eleventh Doctor's time stream in the end of "The Name of the Doctor." Archival images were used for his appearance in "The Day of the Doctor". During the special, Tom Baker portrays a mysterious museum curator who speaks with the Eleventh Doctor and hints to him that he may be a future version of the Doctor "revisiting" a favourite past incarnation. The Fourth Doctor is also seen briefly during Missy's exposition of the Twelfth Doctor's fighting android assassins ("The Witch's Familiar"). The Fourth Doctor also appears via archival footage taken from Pyramids of Mars in "Empire of Death" to provide context on the return of Sutekh.

== Development ==
=== Casting ===
The Doctor had been played by three actors between Doctor Who's debut in 1963 and Tom Baker's casting. The concept of regeneration—a biological process in which the title character takes on a new body when fatally injured—had been introduced in 1966 to allow the production team to change lead actors.

"When I was doing Doctor Who, it was the realisation of all my childhood fantasies... so I took to it like a duck to water, and I still do. Doctor Who was more important than life to me - I used to dread the end of rehearsal..."

— Baker on the role of the Fourth Doctor in 2017

English actor Tom Baker established himself playing eccentric supporting roles in genre and fantasy films. Baker was attached to three film projects which had all collapsed by late 1973. He was working part-time on a building site and became anxious at his career prospects. On 3 February 1974, he wrote to Bill Slater, a director he had previously worked with who had been recently appointed as BBC Head of Serials, asking for acting work. Slater recommended Baker to Doctor Who producer Barry Letts, who was seeking a successor to Third Doctor actor Jon Pertwee. Letts and script editor Terrance Dicks were impressed by Baker's performance in the recent fantasy adventure film The Golden Voyage of Sinbad (1973), and following a meeting with Baker in the BBC bar, the actor was quickly cast as the Fourth Doctor. Baker's casting was announced to the press on 15 February. He was considered the first "non-name actor" cast as the Doctor.

Baker relished his status as a children's hero, preferring to be the Doctor than to return to his "tangled" private life. He avoided smoking or swearing in public out of awareness that the Doctor was considered a role model for children. Baker became proprietorial over the role of the Doctor and often berated writers and directors whose work he disliked.

In 1980, Baker clashed with newly-appointed producer John Nathan-Turner. He found Nathan-Turner's approach to the series "unbearable" and decided it was time to depart the role. Baker stated in 2014 that he may have stayed in the role for one season too long. Baker announced his departure on 24 October 1980, and he was succeeded by Peter Davison as the Fifth Doctor in Logopolis (1981).

=== Characterisation ===
Although Baker had little idea of how he would play his version of the Doctor when cast, he quickly made the part his own, highlighting the character's alien qualities. Baker incorporated much of his own eccentric personality into the Doctor's and frequently made comedic scripting suggestions and ad-libs.

"My Doctor Who was entirely Tom. It was just Tom. I wasn't acting. ...they said how are you going to do it? And I said I don't know. And I started saying the lines and the children loved it... I thought hey, so who wants to act? I can be Tom."

— Baker in a 2010 interview

He was required to shave off his beard for the role. According to Baker, the Doctor's scarf was the idea of costume designer James Acheson. Knowing little about knitting, Acheson procured large quantities of wool in various colours and commissioned Begonia Pope, a friend of his, to create a colourful design. She proceeded to use all of the wool provided, resulting in the absurdly long, but iconic, accessory. According to both the creators of the show and Baker, the character's look was originally based on paintings and posters by Henri de Toulouse-Lautrec of his friend, Aristide Bruant, a singer and nightclub owner whose trademark was a black cloak and long red scarf.

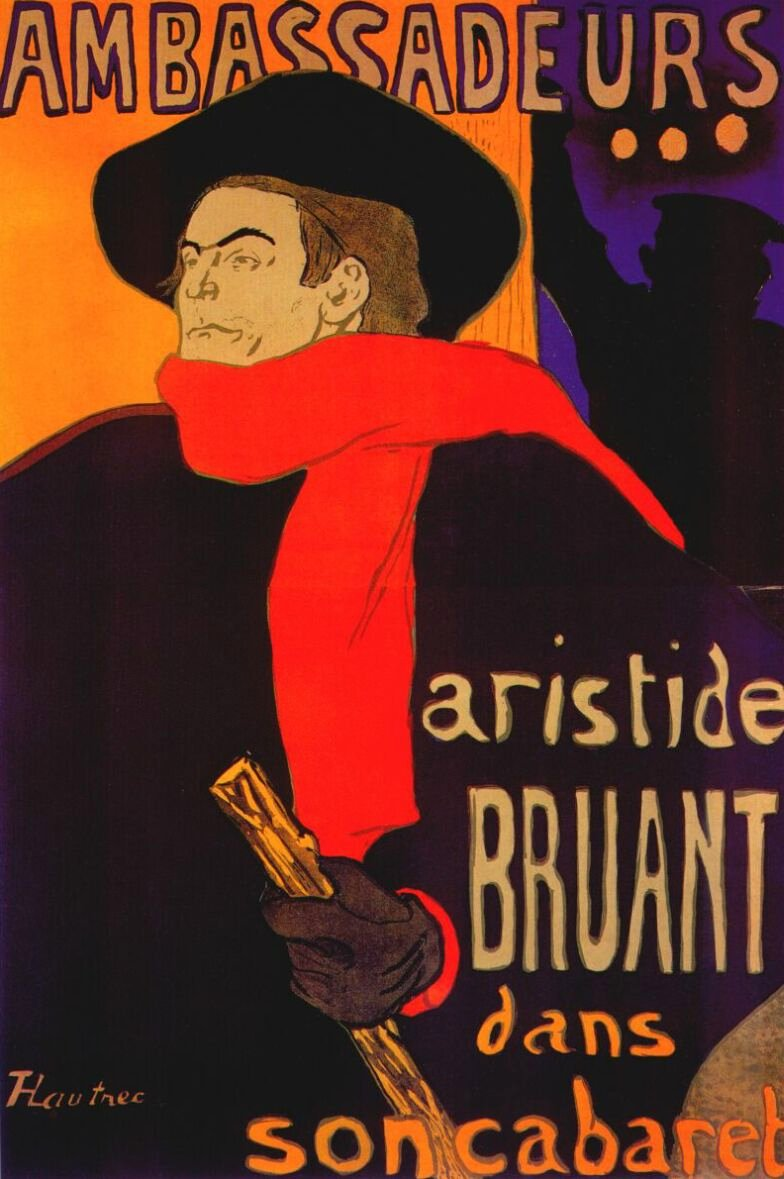
Painting of Aristide Bruant by Lautrec, which inspired the Doctor's famous look.

Imposingly tall, with eyes that seem to constantly boggle, a mass of curls for hair and prominently displayed teeth, the Doctor favours an outfit that usually consists of a white shirt, waistcoat, cravat, trousers, a frock coat (with pockets containing a seemingly endless array of apparently useless items that would nevertheless suit the Doctor's purposes when used), a fedora and, most famously, his impractically long, multi-coloured scarf, which was apparently knitted for him by Madame Nostradamus (whom he refers to as a "witty little knitter"). When it is damaged in The Ark in Space (1975), the Doctor declares with regret that it is "irreplaceable."

Producer Philip Hinchcliffe had wardrobe create four distinct coats for Baker to wear depending on the type of story, the first being a rust safari jacket that he wore throughout all of his first season and for two serials of his second; the other three (full-length) coats were of dark plum burgundy velvet, later replaced by a similar dark brown velvet following the in universe loss of the former in The Deadly Assassin and light grey tweed. The Wardrobe Department also sourced a brown wide-brimmed felt fedora from Herbert Johnson. The rest of Baker's costume pieces (cravats, trousers, boots, shoes, waistcoats and shirts) were sourced from various sources, with several pieces custom made for Baker, notably his brown leather knee length cuff boots acquired during the production of The Deadly Assassin. A wider, brighter-coloured scarf debuted with Baker's fourth season and a light brown coat was introduced late in his fifth season. Baker also appeared in a one-off Sherlock Holmes-inspired costume in The Talons of Weng-Chiang.

When John Nathan-Turner became the show's producer in Baker's last year, the Fourth Doctor was the first to sport an item of clothing adorned with question marks as a motif, in this case, above the points on his shirt collars. His overall costume was redesigned, changing the colour focus from brown to burgundy. Designer June Hudson later revealed in an interview that Nathan-Turner had even given her permission to remove the scarf altogether if she wanted to. Hudson opted to keep the scarf, as it was such an iconic part of the character, changing it to crimson with violet purple stripes, although knitted from lighter weight chenille. The Doctor also gained a new wool greatcoat, waistcoat and corduroy breeches, with matching hat, which he wore for the remainder of his incarnation.

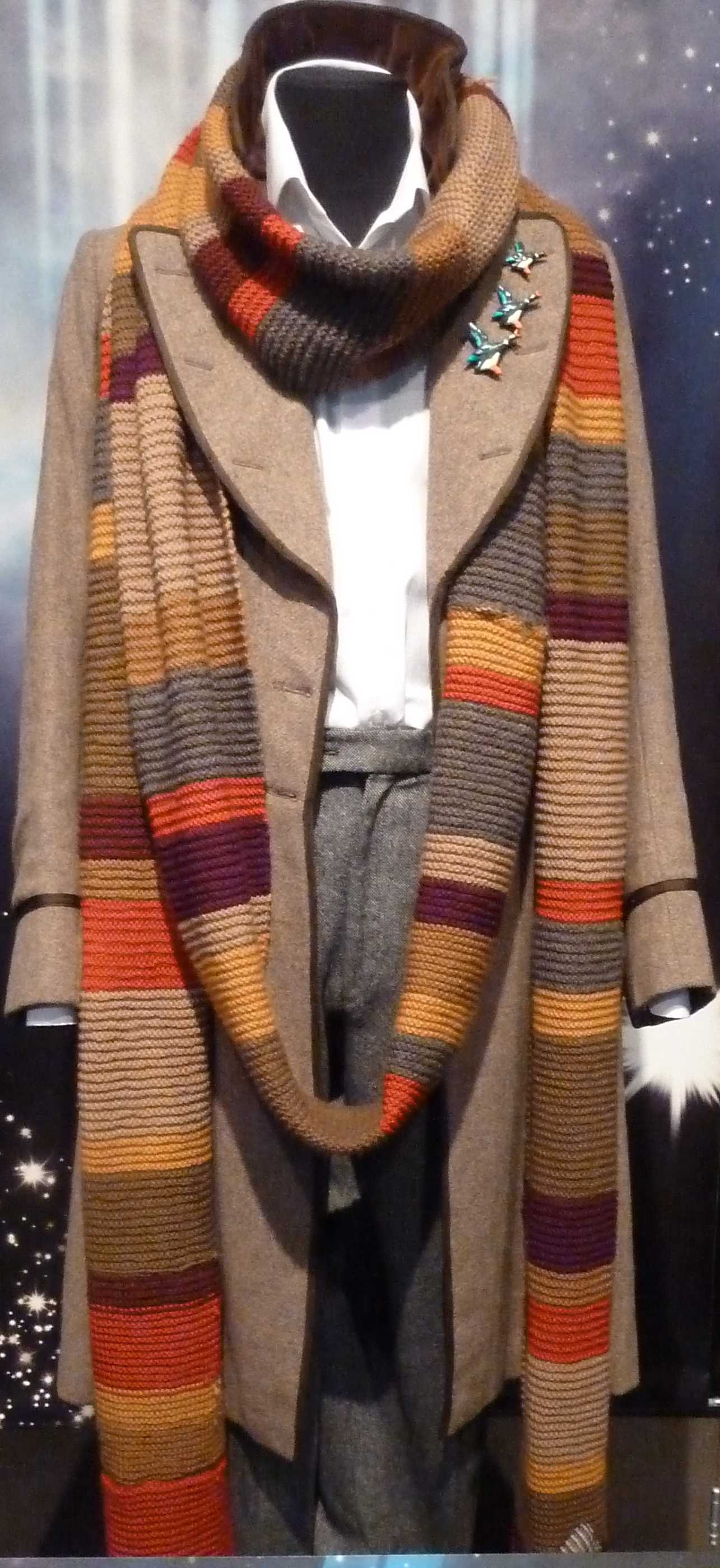
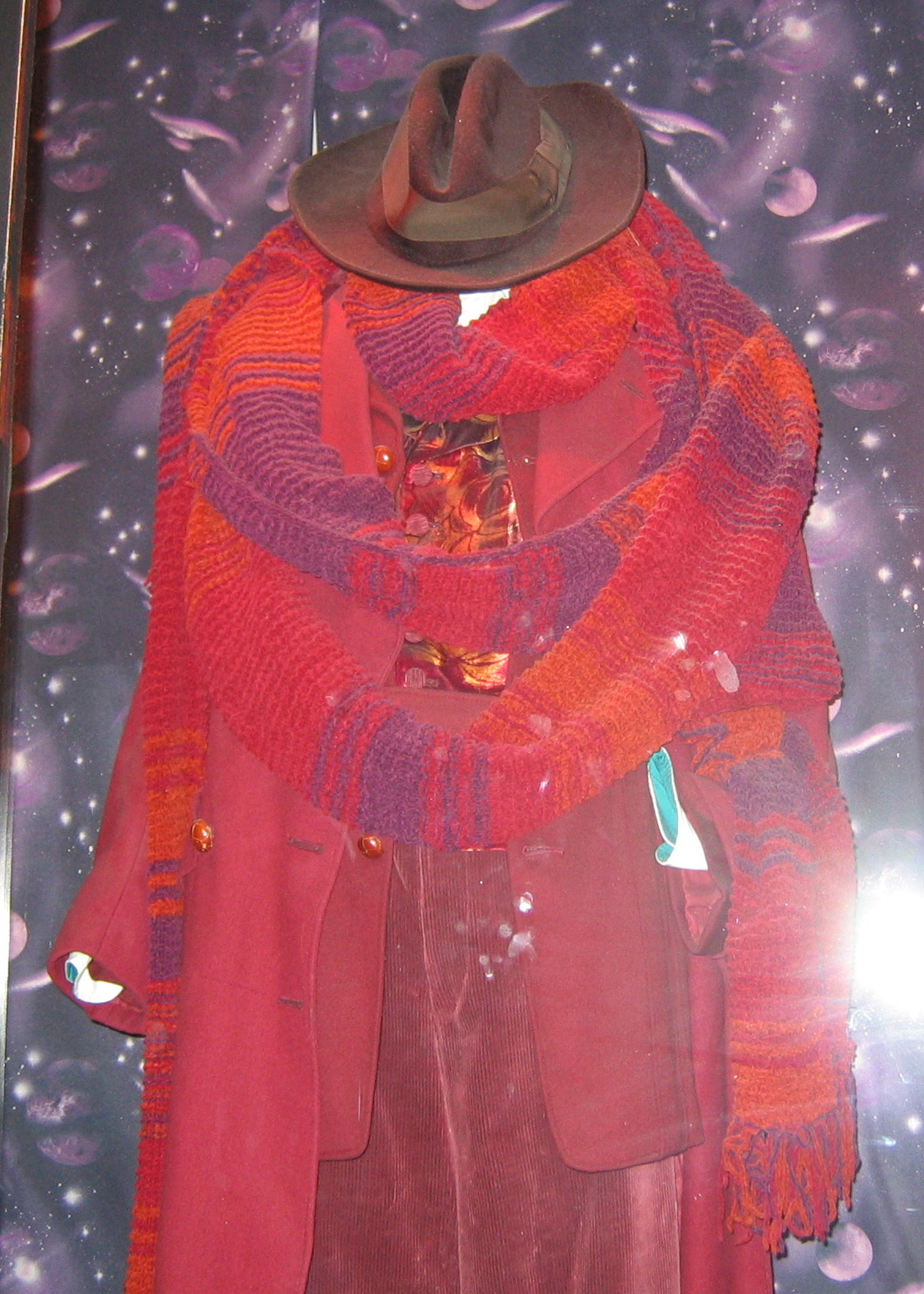
Two variants of the Fourth Doctor's costume.

=== Reception ===
This incarnation is generally regarded as one of the most recognisable of the Doctors and one of the most popular, especially in the United States. In polls conducted by Doctor Who Magazine, Tom Baker has lost the "Best Doctor" category only three times: once to Sylvester McCoy (the Seventh Doctor) in 1990, and twice to David Tennant (the Tenth Doctor) in 2006 and 2009. The Fourth Doctor's eccentric style of dress and speech – particularly his trademark look of wearing a long scarf and having a fondness for Jelly Babies – made him an immediately recognisable figure and he quickly captivated the viewing public's imagination. The producer of Baker's early seasons, Philip Hinchcliffe, stated that the Fourth Doctor's bohemian appearance and anti-establishment style appealed to older, college-age students. The Fourth Doctor's time enjoyed a significant boost in viewing figures, averaging between 8 and 10 million viewers in just his first year (20–25 percent of the entire viewing audience of Britain). By 1979, the figures averaged between 9 and 11 million, going as high as 16.1 million for the final episode of City of Death (though this was during the ITV technicians strike of 1979 which meant the BBC was the sole broadcaster on the air for several weeks).

After succeeding Jon Pertwee's Third Doctor, Baker's portrayal of the Fourth was not initially received enthusiastically by all of the critics. One writer in the Daily Mail complained in early 1975 that, "Mr. Baker makes Doctor Who look like Harpo Marx let loose from Horse Feathers." Baker himself responded by saying, "We are not playing Doctor Who for laughs. I am trying to stress his strangeness, that he is not of this world, not human, therefore his reactions will be different from ours. I take it all very seriously. He has to be genuinely lovable, not pleased by violence, and he must be honest. Humorous, but never comical."

There are also novels and audio plays featuring the Fourth Doctor. Two early audio plays featuring Tom Baker voicing the Fourth Doctor date from Baker's television tenure as he had mainly declined to appear in any further audio plays since leaving the series. In 2009, however, it was announced that a new five-part series would be produced by BBC Audio (see below).

== Story style ==
The early stories of the Fourth Doctor were characterised by a strong "Gothic Horror" theme. The duo of writer/script editor Robert Holmes and producer Philip Hinchcliffe consciously tapped into horror icons like mummies (Pyramids of Mars) and Frankenstein (The Brain of Morbius, Robot), vampires (State of Decay) and Jekyll and Hyde (Planet of Evil), and even transformation (The Ark in Space, The Seeds of Doom) and various themes like alien abduction. In these stories, they were given a science fiction explanation, rather than the typical magic.

The Hinchcliffe Era (1974–1977) is one of the most controversial in the classic series run, the increasing horror elements and depictions of violence attracted much criticism from Mary Whitehouse, who had previously attacked the Barry Letts era for serials like Terror of the Autons (1971). The controversy led BBC Director General to apologise to Whitehouse for the ending of one episode of The Seeds of Doom (1976). Hinchcliffe was moved on to police drama Target in 1977 at the conclusion of his third year. Graham Williams – who had been developing Target – was brought on to take over as producer for Baker's fourth season.

Williams was given specific instructions to lighten the tone of the stories, thus playing to Baker's strengths. However, the first three stories (which were geared towards the previous style) had already been commissioned. Robert Holmes had agreed to stay on to edit them, but he ended up leaving after only doing the first two, Horror of Fang Rock (1977) and The Invisible Enemy (1977). The task of editing Image of the Fendahl (1977) fell to his successor Anthony Read. The season was only narrowly finished. With the cast and crew suffering from burnout and lack of resources, the season finale The Invasion of Time (1978) was completed largely by virtue of it having been written to make use of preexisting sets, props, and costumes.

For their second season, Williams and Read had planned out an overarching storyline that would run through the whole of the season. With more editorial control, it was also decided that the writers would put more emphasis on elements of fantasy and humour. Holmes wrote the first story, The Ribos Operation (1978), and the writing team of Bob Baker and Dave Martin handled what would be the final story of the season, The Armageddon Factor (1979). Douglas Adams wrote the second story, The Pirate Planet (1978), while another newcomer, David Fisher, wrote the third and fourth stories. Again, difficulties began to arise when the fifth story fell through. Robert Holmes consented to writing what would become The Power of Kroll (1978–79).

Williams' third and final year on the show is considered a high point in terms of ratings and stories for the entire series. However it proved even more difficult for Williams behind the scenes, as he found Tom Baker increasingly hard to cope with. The most watched episode ever of Doctor Who was "Part 4" of City of Death (by Fisher, Adams, and Williams) which drew 16.1 million viewers. Douglas Adams became script editor and his style can be seen in the dialogue and stories. For example, in Destiny of the Daleks (1979), Adams included a scene of the Doctor trapped under a boulder that resembles a similar scene in the second series of The Hitchhiker's Guide to the Galaxy. His time as script editor was beset by problems; Adams often ended up having to greatly edit and even rewrite stories. Once again, facing burnout and lack of funds, Adams eventually agreed to write the final story Shada. Production proved difficult and ended up being unfinished due to a strike at the BBC. Williams left the show, dissatisfied with having left on what he considered to be a low note.

In Season 18, John Nathan-Turner became the series' producer. He instituted a number of changes to the show, including toning down the humour and introducing more science fiction concepts. During this season the Fourth Doctor became very much subdued and, on occasion, melancholy. Baker began the season in poor health, though he eventually recovered. Both the actor and the character seemed noticeably older and tired, due to Baker's gaunt appearance and greying hair. Baker had been finding the role harder and harder to maintain and the previous season had been particularly draining on him. Many of this season's stories also had an elegiac tone, with entropy and decay being a recurring theme.

New script editor Christopher Bidmead found himself faced with a serious problem from the outset of his time on the show. He ultimately deemed many of the stories left to him by Adams to be unusable, being too close to the humour-driven stories of the previous season. The only one he ended up using was The Leisure Hive (1980), though only after heavily editing it. Bidmead asked a pair of writing friends to come up with what would be the second story of the season, Meglos (1980), which ended up being regarded as one of the weakest shows in the series' history up to that point.

Bidmead only began to gain some momentum by the fifth story, Warriors' Gate. The story is notable for the Doctor's sombre mood and seeming death wish, as well as the surprisingly adult nature of the story. The surreal, even dream-like elements, such as time shifts and walking through mirrors, also earned the story some distinction. At John Nathan-Turner's insistence the Master was brought back. This was accomplished by Bidmead changing the villain in The Keeper of Traken (1981) into the Master.

The overarching theme of decay reaches its conclusion in Baker's final story Logopolis (1981), which Bidmead personally wrote. The story is particularly sombre, even grim at times. Themes of decay and death are constant in the story, personified in the ghostly Watcher, effectively a harbinger of the Fourth Doctor's 'death'.

The Fourth Doctor's stories saw fewer recurring (or returning) enemies than in previous eras. The Daleks only appeared twice and the Cybermen only had one story, Revenge of the Cybermen (1975). UNIT, which had featured in most of the Third Doctor's adventures, only appeared in four early Fourth Doctor stories, playing a minor role in its last appearance, season 13's The Seeds of Doom (1976) in which none of the regular UNIT staff appeared.

At the same time, stories such as The Deadly Assassin (1976) established most of the mythology surrounding the Time Lords and the Doctor's home planet Gallifrey and that would remain a key feature for the rest of the classic series and still be felt in the revived series. For example, it is established that Time Lords only have a limited number of regenerations, which is a driving plot point in the stories Mawdryn Undead, "The Five Doctors", The Trial of a Time Lord, the 1996 television movie and the 2013 Christmas special "The Time of the Doctor".

== International reception ==
For audiences in the United States, who saw the show only in syndication (mostly on PBS), Tom Baker was the incarnation of the Doctor who is the best known, since his episodes were the ones most frequently broadcast stateside. The first four seasons of these Time Life distributed stories added narration by Howard da Silva at the beginning and end of each episode. Also in Italy, where most of the classic series of Doctor Who were never broadcast on television, the only episodes to be broadcast were those of the Fourth Doctor.

== Other appearances ==
=== Spoofs ===
The Fourth Doctor's distinctive appearance and manner have made him a target for affectionate parody. The character has appeared several times on The Simpsons and twice on Robot Chicken. He also had a cameo on Futurama emerging from the stomach of a space whale, and another episode, where he is briefly seen running into the TARDIS. On The Big Bang Theory, Stuart dresses as The Fourth Doctor at a party in the episode “The Justice League Recombination”. In the computer game Hugo II, Whodunit?, the player can save the Fourth Doctor from a Dalek in return for his sonic screwdriver. He is frequently impersonated by impressionist Jon Culshaw on the radio and television series Dead Ringers, who also voiced the Doctor for the Big Finish audio The Kingmaker. Archival footage of the Fourth Doctor's first title sequence was used in the Family Guy episode "Blue Harvest" to parody hyperspace from Star Wars. In American Dad! some Whovians were shown, with several of them dressed as the Fourth Doctor. As the narrator of Little Britain, Tom Baker has himself alluded to Doctor Who. In the 24th episode of the series Epic Rap Battles of History the Tenth Doctor is in a rap battle with Doc Brown from Back to the Future when he is shot by a Dalek and regenerates into the Fourth Doctor (played by George Watsky).

A background character appearing in one episode of Toast of London portrayed by Lewis MacLeod highly resembles the fourth incarnation of the Doctor, and is heavily implied to be him in the episode itself. Peter Davison, who played the fifth incarnation, also appears in the series as himself.

=== Advertising ===
In 1979 and 1980, Tom Baker played the Fourth Doctor (alongside Lalla Ward's Romana) in a series of four television commercials for Prime Computer. Disliking the scripts he was given, Baker agreed to film the advertisements only if he could rewrite them himself, and added a scene where the Doctor follows the computer's instruction to marry Romana. In 1997, Baker reprised the role once again in a spot for New Zealand's National Superannuation insurance company.

=== Argo Records audio drama ===
- Doctor Who and the Pescatons

=== BBC audio dramas ===
- Exploration Earth: "The Time Machine"
- Hornets' Nest
- Demon Quest
- Serpent Crest

Tom Baker also recorded narration, in character as the Fourth Doctor, for a 1976 audio release of Genesis of the Daleks, which was subsequently re-issued by the BBC on cassette and CD as a radio drama. Baker returned again to Doctor Who for the 1990s audio cassette releases of "lost" Doctor Who stories. For some of these stories, he is in character as the Doctor. For others, he merely provides descriptive narration.

=== Big Finish audio dramas ===
- The Kingmaker (cameo voiced by Jon Culshaw—see above)
- The Beautiful People (adventure related by the character Romana II) (2007)
- The Catalyst (adventure related by the character Leela) (2008)
- Empathy Games (adventure related by the character Leela) (2008)
- Stealers from Saiph (adventure related by the character Romana I) (2009)
- The Pyralis Effect (adventure related by the character Romana II) (2009)
- The Time Vampire (adventure related by the character Leela) (2010)
- The Invasion of E-Space (adventure related by the character Romana II) (2010)
- Ferril's Folly (adventure related by the character Romana I) (2011)
- Tales from the Vault (short adventure related by the character Romana I) (2011)
- The Fourth Doctor Boxset (adventures related by the characters the Fourth Doctor & Leela) (2011)
  - The Foe from the Future
  - The Valley of Death
- Destination Nerva (adventure related by the characters the Fourth Doctor & Leela) (2012)
- The Renaissance Man (adventure related by the characters the Fourth Doctor & Leela) (2012)
- The Wrath of the Iceni (adventure related by the characters the Fourth Doctor & Leela) (2012)
- Energy of the Daleks (adventure related by the characters the Fourth Doctor & Leela) (2012)
- Trail of the White Worm (adventure related by the characters the Fourth Doctor & Leela) (2012)
- The Oseidon Adventure (adventure related by the characters the Fourth Doctor & Leela) (2012)
- The Child (adventure related by the character Leela) (2012)
- The Auntie Matter (adventure related by the characters the Fourth Doctor & Romana I) (2013)
- The Sands of Life (adventure related by the characters the Fourth Doctor, Romana I & K9) (2013)
- War Against The Laan (adventure related by the characters the Fourth Doctor & Romana I) (2013)
- The Justice of Jalxar (adventure related by the characters the Fourth Doctor, Romana I, Jago & Litefoot) (2013)
- Phantoms of the Deep (adventure related by the characters the Fourth Doctor, Romana I & K9) (2013)
- The Dalek Contract (adventure related by the characters the Fourth Doctor, Romana I & K9) (2013)
- The Final Phase (adventure related by the characters the Fourth Doctor, Romana I & K9) (2013)
- Destiny of the Doctor: Babblesphere (adventure related by the character Romana II) (2013)
- The Light at the End (50th Anniversary Special; Fourth Doctor voiced by Tom Baker) (2013)
- Night of the Stormcrow (adventure related by the characters the Fourth Doctor & Leela) (2013)
- Luna Romana (adventure related by the characters Romana II & Romana III) (2014)
- The King of Sontar (adventure related by the characters the Fourth Doctor & Leela) (2014)
- White Ghosts (adventure related by the characters the Fourth Doctor & Leela) (2014)
- The Crooked Man (adventure related by the characters the Fourth Doctor & Leela) (2014)
- Last of the Colophon (adventure related by the characters the Fourth Doctor & Leela) (2014)
- Destroy the Infinite (adventure related by the characters the Fourth Doctor & Leela) (2014)
- The Abandoned (adventure related by the characters the Fourth Doctor & Leela) (2014)
- Zygon Hunt (adventure related by the characters the Fourth Doctor & Leela) (2014)
- Doctor Who: Philip Hinchcliffe Presents (adventure related by the characters the Fourth Doctor & Leela) (2014)
  - The Ghosts of Gralstead
  - The Devil's Armada
- The Romance of Crime (adventure related by the characters the Fourth Doctor, Romana II & K9) (2015)
- The English way of Death (adventure related by the characters the Fourth Doctor, Romana II & K9) (2015)
- The Exxilons (adventure related by the characters the Fourth Doctor, Leela & K9) (2015)
- The Darkness of Glass (adventure related by the characters the Fourth Doctor & Leela) (2015)
- Requiem for the Rocket Men (adventure related by the characters the Fourth Doctor, Leela & K9) (2015)
- Death Match (adventure related by the characters the Fourth Doctor, Leela & K9) (2015)
- Suburban Hell (adventure related by the characters the Fourth Doctor & Leela) (2015)
- The Cloisters of Terror (adventure related by the characters the Fourth Doctor & Leela) (2015)
- The Fate of Krelos (adventure related by the characters the Fourth Doctor, Leela & K9) (2015)
- Return to Telos (adventure related by the characters the Fourth Doctor, Leela & K9) (2015)
- The Well-Mannered War (adventure related by the characters the Fourth Doctor, Romana II & K9) (2015)
- The Wave of Destruction (adventure related by the characters the Fourth Doctor, Romana II & K9) (2016)
- The Labyrinth of Buda Castle (adventure related by the characters the Fourth Doctor & Romana II) (2016)
- The Paradox Planet (adventure related by the characters the Fourth Doctor, Romana II & K9) (2016)
- Legacy of Death (adventure related by the characters the Fourth Doctor, Romana II & K9) (2016)
- Gallery of Ghouls (adventure related by the characters the Fourth Doctor & Romana II) (2016)
- The Trouble with Draxx (adventure related by the characters the Fourth Doctor, Romana II & K9) (2016)
- The Pursuit of History (adventure related by the characters the Fourth Doctor, Romana II & K9) (2016)
- Casualties of Time (adventure related by the characters the Fourth Doctor, Romana II & K9) (2016)
- The Genesis Chamber (adventure related by the characters the Fourth Doctor & Leela) (2016)
- The Beast of Kravenos (adventure related by the characters the Fourth Doctor, Romana II & K9) (2017)
- The Eternal Battle (adventure related by the characters the Fourth Doctor, Romana II & K9) (2017)
- The Silent Scream (adventure related by the characters the Fourth Doctor, Romana II & K9) (2017)
- Dethras (adventure related by the characters the Fourth Doctor & Romana II) (2017)
- The Helm of Awe (adventure related by the characters the Fourth Doctor & Leela) (2017)
- The Haunting of Malkin Place (adventure related by the characters the Fourth Doctor & Romana II) (2017)
- Subterranea (adventure related by the characters the Fourth Doctor & Romana II) (2017)
- The Movellan Grave (adventure related by the characters the Fourth Doctor & Romana II) (2017)
- Night of the Vashta Nerada (adventure related by the character the Fourth Doctor) (2017)
- The Skin of the Sleek (adventure related by the characters the Fourth Doctor & Romana II) (2017)
- The Thief Who Stole Time (adventure related by the characters the Fourth Doctor & Romana II) (2017)
- The Sons of Kaldor (adventure related by the characters the Fourth Doctor & Leela) (2018)
- The Crowmarsh Experiment (adventure related by the characters the Fourth Doctor & Leela) (2018)
- The Mind-Runners (adventure related by the characters the Fourth Doctor, Leela & K9) (2018)
- The Demon Rises (adventure related by the characters the Fourth Doctor, Leela & K9) (2018)
- The Shadow of London (adventure related by the characters the Fourth Doctor & Leela) (2018)
- The Bad Penny (adventure related by the characters the Fourth Doctor & Leela) (2018)
- Kill the Doctor! (adventure related by the characters the Fourth Doctor & Leela) (2018)
- The Age of Sutekh (adventure related by the characters the Fourth Doctor & Leela) (2018)

=== Short Trips audios ===
- Death-Dealer
- Chain Reaction
- Seven to One
- The Wondrous Box
- The Old Rogue

=== Audio books ===
- Glass
- Old Flames

=== Novels ===
==== Virgin New Adventures ====
- Timewyrm: Genesys by John Peel (appears as a holographic message for the Seventh Doctor, warning his future self of danger before his memory of the threat is lost)
- Timewyrm: Revelation by Paul Cornell (appears as the Doctor's memory of him in the Seventh Doctor's subconscious)

==== Virgin Missing Adventures ====
- Evolution by John Peel
- The Romance of Crime by Gareth Roberts
- System Shock by Justin Richards
- Managra by Stephen Marley
- The English Way of Death by Gareth Roberts
- The Shadow of Weng-Chiang by David A. McIntee
- A Device of Death by Christopher Bulis
- The Well-Mannered War by Gareth Roberts

==== Past Doctor Adventures ====
- Eye of Heaven by Jim Mortimore
- Last Man Running by Chris Boucher
- Millennium Shock by Justin Richards
- Corpse Marker by Chris Boucher
- Tomb of Valdemar by Simon Messingham
- Heart of TARDIS by Dave Stone (Also features the Second Doctor, although neither Doctor meets the other, each Doctor simply tackling a different end of the same crisis with only the Fourth aware of his other self's involvement)
- Festival of Death by Jonathan Morris
- Asylum by Peter Darvill-Evans (features the Fourth Doctor early in his life interacting with Nyssa from a point after she has left the Fifth Doctor)
- Psi-ence Fiction by Chris Boucher
- Drift by Simon A. Forward
- Wolfsbane by Jacqueline Rayner (Also features the Eighth Doctor, although neither are aware of the other's actions due to the Eighth Doctor's current amnesia, the Fourth simply tying up loose ends left by the Eighth)
- Match of the Day by Chris Boucher
- Doctor Who: Shada: The Lost Adventure by Douglas Adams by Gareth Roberts

==== Eighth Doctor Adventures ====
- The Eight Doctors by Terrance Dicks
- Seen in the TARDIS mirror in Camera Obscura

==== Telos Doctor Who novellas ====
- Ghost Ship by Keith Topping

==== Penguin Fiftieth Anniversary eBook novellas ====
- The Roots of Evil by Philip Reeve

==== Other ====
- Scratchman by Tom Baker and James Goss

=== Comics ===
==== TV Comic ====
- "Death Flower"
- "Return of the Daleks"
- "The Wreckers"
- "The Emperor's Spy"
- "The Sinister Sea"
- "The Space Ghost"
- "The Dalek Revenge"
- "Virus"
- "Treasure Trails"
- "Hubert's Folly"
- "Counter-Rotation"
- "Mind Snatch"
- "The Hoaxers"
- "The Mutant Strain"
- "Double Trouble"
- "Dredger"
- "The False Planet"
- "The Fire Feeders"
- "Kling Dynasty"
- "The Orb"
- "The Mutants"
- "The Devil's Mouth"
- "The Aqua-City"
- "The Snow Devils"
- "The Space Garden"
- "The Eerie Manor"
- "Guardian of the Tomb"
- "The Image Makers"

==== TV Comic Annual ====
- "Woden's Warrior"
- "The Tansbury Experiment"
- "Jackels of Space"

==== TV Comic Specials ====
- "The Sky Warriors"

==== Doctor Who Magazine ====
- "Black Destiny"
- "Victims"
- "The Iron Legion"
- "City of the Damned"
- "K9's Finest Hour"
- "Timeslip"
- "The Star Beast"
- "The Dogs of Doom"
- "The Time Witch"
- "Dragon's Claw"
- "The Collector"
- "Dreamers of Death"
- "The Life Bringer"
- "War of the Words"
- "Spider-God"
- "The Deal"
- "End of the Line"
- "The Freefall Warriors"
- "Junkyard Demon"
- "Neutron Knights"

==== Doctor Who Magazine specials ====
- "The Naked Flame"
- "Rest and Re-Creation"
- "The Seventh Segment"
- "Starbeast II"
- "Junkyard Demons II"

==== IDW series ====
- "The Forgotten"
- "The Time Machination"
- Star Trek: The Next Generation/Doctor Who: Assimilation2 (Flashback of the Fourth Doctor)
- "Prisoners of Time"

=== Video games ===
- Dalek Attack
- Destiny of the Doctors
- Lego Dimensions
- Fall Guys

== See also ==
- Doctor Who and the Daleks in the Seven Keys to Doomsday – a stage play that opened two weeks before Baker began his tenure as the Doctor. In the play, Trevor Martin plays an alternate version of the Fourth Doctor.
