= Whose Doctor Who =

- Genre: Documentary
- Directed by: Tony Cash
- Starring: Melvyn Bragg; Tom Baker
- Country of origin: United Kingdom
- Original language: English
- No. of series: 1
- No. of episodes: 1

Production
- Executive producer: Bill Morton
- Producer: Tony Cash
- Editors: Sam Upton; David Martin
- Camera setup: Philip Bonham-Carter
- Running time: 60 minutes

Original release
- Network: BBC2
- Release: 3 April 1977

Related
- Doctor Who

"Whose Doctor Who" (a.k.a. 'Whose Dr. Who') is a 60-minute television documentary, (part of the BBC's The Lively Arts series) which was first transmitted on Sunday, 3 April 1977, on BBC2. It was produced and directed by Tony Cash; Bill Morton was Executive Producer. Melvyn Bragg presented the episode.

== Format ==
The programme was the first in-depth documentary chronicling the long-running BBC TV series Doctor Who. It was first broadcast the day after the airing of the sixth part of The Talons of Weng-Chiang, which closed off the fourteenth season of the show. The programme features numerous clips from episodes of Doctor Who, along with interviews of cast and fans, including families, children, students, teachers, psychologists and educationalists. Tom Baker and outgoing producer Philip Hinchcliffe both contributed interviews. Behind-the-scenes footage showed the recording of The Talons of Weng-Chiang, as well as rehearsals and pre-production planning.

It included many clips from past Doctor Who stories dating back to the first serial, An Unearthly Child, which aired in 1963. These include footage from Galaxy Four and The Invasion, which no longer exist in their entirety. Clips included from these episodes were shown from 16mm film copies, the original videotapes having been wiped. The use of the Galaxy Four clip from episode 1 ("Four Hundred Dawns") ensured that this remains the only surviving footage of that episode, and was for many years thought to be only surviving footage from the serial as a whole until the full episode 3 ("Air Lock") was recovered in 2011. See also Doctor Who missing episodes.

== Merchandising ==
The show was never repeated on the BBC, but has been included on both the original and special DVD releases of The Talons of Weng-Chiang.

On 1 November 2023, the documentary, along with all of Classic Doctor Who, was added to BBC iPlayer under the Whoniverse section.

== Follow-up documentary ==
In 2020, to coincide with the release of the original documentary on Blu-ray, a new documentary was commissioned as a bonus for the disc set, entitled "Whose Doctor Who Revisited". This was introduced by fan Toby Hadoke. Several contributors to the original documentary reviewed and reminisced the original interviews.
