= Angus MacKay (actor) =

English actor (1926–2013)

- Born: Angus Newton MacKay; 15 July 1926; Birmingham, Warwickshire, England
- Died: 8 June 2013 (aged 86); London, England
- Occupation: Actor
- Notable work: Doctor Who; Only Fools and Horses

Angus Newton MacKay (15 July 1926 – 8 June 2013) was an English actor.

He amassed numerous television credits during his career in programmes such as The Gentle Touch, One Foot in the Grave, Only Fools and Horses, Howards' Way, The Professionals, Steptoe and Son (as the salesman for the water bed), The Sweeney, Minder and Z-Cars.

In Doctor Who he was the first actor to play the character Borusa in the story The Deadly Assassin (1976); and was the Headmaster in the story Mawdryn Undead (1983).

== Filmography ==
- Nothing But the Best (1964) - Clergyman
- Darling (1965) - Ivor Dawlish (uncredited)
- Morgan – A Suitable Case for Treatment (1966) - Best Man
- Secret Ceremony (1968) - Vicar (uncredited)
- Revenge (1971) - Priest
- Percy (1971) - TV producer
- Quest for Love (1971) - Dr. Rankin
- The Mirror Crack'd (1980) - Coroner (uncredited)
- Lady Killers (1980) - Dr. James Henry Morton
- National Lampoon's European Vacation (1985) - Announcer at Court
- Clockwise (1986) - First Class Passenger
- Prick Up Your Ears (1987) - RADA Judge
- Bullseye! (1990) - Reverend Simkin
- King Ralph (1991) - Assistant Tailor
