= The Deadly Assassin =

088 – The Deadly Assassin
- Doctor Who serial
- Chancellor Goth (Bernard Horsfall) drowns the Doctor (Tom Baker). The scene generated controversy due to its violence and would be removed from the third episode's master tapes.

Cast
- Doctor: Tom Baker – Fourth Doctor
- Others: Peter Pratt – The Master; Angus MacKay – Borusa; Bernard Horsfall – Chancellor Goth; Erik Chitty – Co-Ordinator Engin; George Pravda – Castellan Spandrell; Derek Seaton – Commander Hilred; Maurice Quick – Gold Usher; Hugh Walters – Runcible; Llewellyn Rees – The President; John Dawson, Michael Bilton – Time Lords; Peter Mayock – Solis; Helen Blatch – Voice

Production
- Directed by: David Maloney
- Written by: Robert Holmes
- Script editor: Robert Holmes (uncredited)
- Produced by: Philip Hinchcliffe
- Executive producer: None
- Music by: Dudley Simpson
- Production code: 4P
- Series: Season 14
- Running time: 4 episodes, 25 minutes each
- First broadcast: 30 October 1976
- Last broadcast: 20 November 1976

Chronology
← Preceded by The Hand of Fear	Followed by → The Face of Evil

The Deadly Assassin is the third serial of the 14th season of the British science fiction television programme Doctor Who, which was first broadcast in four weekly parts on BBC1 from 30 October to 20 November 1976. It is the first serial in which the Doctor is featured without a companion, and the only such story for the classic era.

In the serial, the renegade alien Time Lord the Master (Peter Pratt) seeks to restore his life force by disrupting a power source that would destroy the planet Gallifrey along with his archenemy the Fourth Doctor (Tom Baker).

== Plot ==
The Doctor has a precognition about the President of the Time Lords being assassinated and takes the TARDIS to Gallifrey to stop it. At the Panopticon, a Gallifreyan ceremonial chamber, he notes a camera and a sniper rifle on a catwalk. The Doctor fights his way to the catwalk but an assassin shoots the President dead. The crowd assumes the Doctor is the killer. Under interrogation, he maintains that he has been framed. Castellan Spandrell believes him and orders Engin to assist him in an independent investigation. The Doctor announces that he will run for President, as liberty is guaranteed for those running for office during the course of an election.

He realises that it was the Master who had sent him the vision through the Matrix, a vast electronic neural network which can turn thoughts into virtual reality. Entering the Matrix, the Doctor confronts the assassin, Chancellor Goth. The Doctor fights and defeats Goth, and is released from the Matrix. The Doctor, Spandrell, and Engin arrive where the two were accessing the Matrix, only to find the Master dead and Goth fatally burnt and dying. Goth reveals that he found the Master nearing the end of his final regeneration. He explains that the Master promised him power and knowledge in exchange for service. Dying, Goth warns of the Master's plan.

The Doctor learns about the President's symbols of office: the Sash and Great Key of Rassilon. As the Doctor reads records about the Eye, he realises that the Eye is actually a black hole's nucleus, an inexhaustible energy source, and the Sash and Key are its control devices. The Master's plan is to steal this energy to gain a new cycle of regenerations. However, if the Eye is disrupted, Gallifrey will be destroyed.

The Doctor also realises that the Master injected himself with a neural inhibitor that creates a deathlike state. The Doctor, Spandrell, and Engin arrive at the morgue where the Master seizes the Sash from the President's corpse and traps the three. Inside the Panopticon, the Master makes his way to the Eye and tries to take control of it. The Doctor arrives, as the ground starts shaking and cracks appear in the floor. The two fight until the Master loses his footing and falls into a chasm. The Doctor undoes the Master's work and contains the Eye of Harmony, saving Gallifrey from destruction. The Doctor bids farewell but warns that the Master may not be dead, as he had already harvested some energy. As the Doctor's TARDIS dematerialises, the Master escapes on his own TARDIS.

== Production ==
Following Elisabeth Sladen's departure, Tom Baker told producer Philip Hinchcliffe that he wanted to do a story without a companion. Robert Holmes said that it was difficult to write the script for The Deadly Assassin without anyone for the Doctor to share his thoughts and plans with, which was the usual role of the companion. Working titles for this story included The Dangerous Assassin (which Holmes changed to "deadly" because he thought it "didn't sound right"). The final title is a tautology: a successful assassin must, by definition, be deadly. However, since Time Lords can in general survive death, and the assassin's victims do not, he is perhaps "deadly" in that sense. According to the text commentary on the DVD, Holmes argued that the title was not a tautology, stating that there were plenty of incompetent assassins.

=== Cast notes ===
Bernard Horsfall guest stars as Chancellor Goth. He had previously appeared as an unnamed Time Lord (credited as 'Time Lord 1') in the serial The War Games (1969); extended media have since stated they are the same character. Other parts played by Horsfall in Doctor Who were Gulliver in The Mind Robber (1968) and Taron in Planet of the Daleks (1973), all of which were directed by David Maloney. Angus MacKay later played the Headmaster in Mawdryn Undead (1983). George Pravda previously played Denes in The Enemy of the World (1967–68) and Jaeger in The Mutants (1972). Hugh Walters previously played William Shakespeare in The Chase (1965) and later appeared as Vogel in Revelation of the Daleks (1985).

Peter Pratt, who plays the Master, was previously a leading man with the D'Oyly Carte Opera Company and a radio actor.

== Broadcast and reception ==
Episode	Title	Run time	Original release date	UK viewers (millions)
1	"Part One"	21:13	30 October 1976	11.8
2	"Part Two"	24:44	6 November 1976	12.1
3	"Part Three"	24:24	13 November 1976	13
4	"Part Four"	24:23	20 November 1976	11.8

The cliffhanger to Part Three—where Goth holds the Doctor's head underwater in an attempt to drown him—came in for heavy criticism, particularly from the "clean-up TV" campaigner Mary Whitehouse. She often cited it in interviews as one of the most frightening scenes in Doctor Who, her reasoning being that children would not know if the Doctor survived until the following week and that they would "have this strong image in their minds" during all that time. After the episode's initial broadcast, the BBC apologised to Whitehouse and the master tape was edited to remove the original ending. The edited episode was included when the story was repeated on BBC1 from 4 to 25 August 1977 seen by 4.4, 2.6, 3.8 & 3.5 million viewers.

Paul Cornell, Martin Day and Keith Topping wrote of the serial in The Discontinuity Guide (1995), "The reputation of The Deadly Assassin rests with its violence and its revelations about the Doctor's people and their culture. Politically literate and cynical ('We must adjust the truth'), the serial is the definitive text on the Time Lords. The Doctor's journey into the APC net ... is a visual and intellectual tour de force of hallucinatory images." In The Television Companion (1998), David J. Howe and Stephen James Walker reported that at the time of broadcast several viewers took issue with the serial's portrayal of the Time Lords, finding it a contradiction of the small details that had previously been dropped about the Doctor's home planet, but over time its reputation became more positive. The pair themselves called it "a truly remarkable story" and praised the reintroduction of the Master. In 2010, Patrick Mulkern of Radio Times awarded the serial four stars out of five. He described "the Master's putrid skull and split bangers for fingers" as "the most revolting images presented on teatime TV" but was positive towards its supporting characters, though he did criticise the Matrix sequences for being more earthly rather than alien, despite them being constructed from deceased Time Lords. The A.V. Club reviewer Christopher Bahn praised the plotting and Matrix sequences, calling it "well-crafted all around".

In 2010, Charlie Jane Anders of io9 listed the cliffhanger to the first episode—in which it appears the Doctor shoots the president—as one of the greatest cliffhangers in the history of Doctor Who. Den of Geek named the cliffhanger to the third episode as one of the ten best Doctor Who cliffhangers, praising the freeze frame. In 2013, Starburst also chose Part Three as one of the "Top Ten Doctor Who Cliffhangers". In 2018, Digital Spy described Part Three as "the show's most controversial cliffhanger".

=== Analysis ===
Tat Wood suggests it is "blindingly obvious" that the story was largely inspired by the film and book The Manchurian Candidate.

== Commercial releases ==
=== In print ===
Doctor Who and the Deadly Assassin
- Author: Terrance Dicks
- Cover artist: Mike Little
- Series: Doctor Who book: Target novelisations
- Release number: 19
- Publisher: Target Books
- Publication date: 20 October 1977
- ISBN: 0-426-11965-7

A novelisation of this serial, written by Terrance Dicks, was published by Target Books in October 1977, entitled Doctor Who and The Deadly Assassin.

=== Home media ===
This story was released on VHS in March 1989 in edited omnibus format in the US only. It was released on VHS in episodic format in the UK in October 1991. It was also re-released and remastered for the WHSmith-exclusive Time Lord Collection in 2002 with a better-quality freeze-frame cliffhanger for Episode 3. The Deadly Assassin was released on 11 May 2009 on Region 2 DVD. The serial was released in issue 52 of the Doctor Who DVD Files on 29 December 2010.

It was released on Blu-Ray as part of the Time Lord Victorious box set.

== See also ==
- Simulated reality
