= The Olympian Way =

British TV comedy drama (BBC1, 1981)

The Olympian Way is a BBC comedy drama series set in a health club that was written by Tara Prem and directed by Lovett Bickford. The plot centres around the successful and ambitious millionaire Stan Wilson who has invested heavily in a health club and his son Terry (played by Hugh Fraser) and wife Stella (played by Lois Daine), who run the health club and try not to let Stan down. The series also starred among others Alan Lake, Sharman Macdonald, Ian Brimble, Christopher Ryan, Paul Brooke, Mike Berry (singer), Miles Fothergill and Adrienne Posta and the theme tune was composed by Lynsey De Paul, with each episode having a different verse. Each episode was 45 minutes long and there were 6 episodes in total. It was shown on BBC 1 in 1981, with episode 1 ("Happy Birthday") airing on 1 July and the last episode ("Public Appearance") on 12 August.
