= Miles Fothergill =

British actor (born 1948)

Miles Fothergill (born 25 June 1948) is a British actor, best known for his roles in science fiction television.

He played SV7 in the Doctor Who serial The Robots of Death and also appeared in Blake's 7 episode "The Web". Also for BBC Television he appeared in The Olympian Way (Pebble Mill, 1981) and the Francis Durbridge series Breakaway (1980).

On stage he replaced Jeremy Irons as Judas in the original production of Godspell at the Wyndhams Theatre, London and played Rocky in the late-1970s in The Rocky Horror Show during its original run at the Kings Road Theatre in Chelsea.

He was chosen to be the first male presenter and newsreader for Satellite Television in the mid-1980s, which was the forerunner to Sky TV.

After many years in the city as a media trainer, he now lives in Spain.
