= The Talons of Weng-Chiang =

091 – The Talons of Weng-Chiang
- Doctor Who serial
- The Doctor (Tom Baker) and Professor Litefoot (Trevor Baxter)

Cast
- Doctor: Tom Baker – Fourth Doctor
- Companion: Louise Jameson – Leela
- Others: Christopher Benjamin – Henry Gordon Jago; Trevor Baxter – Professor Litefoot; John Bennett – Li H'sen Chang; Deep Roy – Mr. Sin; Michael Spice – Weng-Chiang/Magnus Greel; Chris Gannon – Casey; Alan Butler – Buller; Tony Then – Lee; Vincent Wong – Ho; John Wu – Coolie; David McKail – Sergeant; Conrad Asquith – PC Quick; Judith Lloyd – Teresa; Vaune Craig-Raymond – Cleaning Woman; Penny Lister – Singer; Patsy Smart – Ghoul; Dudley Simpson – Conductor (uncredited)

Production
- Directed by: David Maloney
- Written by: Robert Holmes
- Produced by: Philip Hinchcliffe
- Music by: Dudley Simpson
- Production code: 4S
- Series: Season 14
- Running time: 6 episodes, 25 minutes each
- First broadcast: 26 February 1977
- Last broadcast: 2 April 1977

Chronology
← Preceded by The Robots of Death	Followed by → Horror of Fang Rock

The Talons of Weng-Chiang is the sixth and final serial of the 14th season of the British science fiction television series Doctor Who, which was first broadcast in six weekly parts on BBC1 from 26 February to 2 April 1977. In the serial, which is set in 19th-century London, the 51st century criminal Magnus Greel (Michael Spice) travels to the city and poses as an ancient Chinese god to find his missing time machine.

Written by script editor Robert Holmes and directed by David Maloney, The Talons of Weng-Chiang was also the final serial to be produced by Philip Hinchcliffe, who had worked on the series for three seasons. One of the most popular serials from the series' original run on television, The Talons of Weng-Chiang has continued to receive acclaim from reviewers and it has been repeatedly voted one of the best stories by fans. Despite this, criticism has been directed towards the serial's stereotypical representation of Chinese characters and an unconvincing giant rat featured in the story.

The serial saw the debut of the characters Henry Gordon Jago and Professor George Litefoot, portrayed by Christopher Benjamin and Trevor Baxter; they would later reprise their roles in audio dramas produced by Big Finish, first in the 2009 The Companion Chronicles episode "The Mahogany Murderers", and then in their own spin-off series Jago & Litefoot from 2010 to 2018.

== Plot ==
The Doctor and Leela arrive in Victorian London. On their way to the Palace Theatre, where stage magician Li H'sen Chang is performing, the Doctor and Leela encounter a group of Chinese men who have killed a cab driver, who was looking for his missing wife. One of the men is arrested and Chang is called in to act as an interpreter; he stealthily gives the henchman a suicide pill, which the henchman takes.

Chang is working for Magnus Greel, a 51st century despot who had fled from the authorities in a time cabinet, now masquerading as the Chinese god Weng-Chiang. The unstable technology of the cabinet has deformed Greel, forcing him to drain the life essences from young women via an extraction machine to keep himself alive. At the same time, Greel is in search of his cabinet, which is now in the possession of Professor Litefoot. He also brought Mr Sin, a cyborg toy, from the future as a henchman.

Greel tracks down the time cabinet and steals it; concurrently the Doctor tracks Greel to the sewers underneath the theatre, aided by the theatre's owner, Henry Gordon Jago. However, Greel has already fled, abandoning Chang to the police. Chang escapes into the sewers, only to be mauled by one of Greel's giant rats. Jago discovers the time cabinet's key and leaves it with a note for the Doctor in Litefoot's house. A group of Greel's henchmen capture Jago and Lightfoot attempting to retake the key. Meanwhile, the Doctor and Leela find Chang dying in an opium den. Chang tells them Greel can be found in the House of the Dragon, but dies before he can give them the exact location.

The Doctor and Leela return to Professor Litefoot's house. There they find the note and key, and decide to wait for Greel and his henchmen. When they arrive, the Doctor asks to be taken to the House of the Dragon, offering the key in exchange for Litefoot and Jago's release. Instead, Greel overpowers the Doctor and locks him in with the two.

Leela, who had been left at Litefoot's house, has followed them and confronts Greel. She is captured by Greel, but before her life essence is drained, the Doctor, Jago and Litefoot escape and rescue her. In a final confrontation, Mr Sin turns on Greel as the Doctor convinces it that Greel escaping in his time cabinet will create a catastrophic implosion. The Doctor defeats Greel by pushing him into his own extraction machine, causing it to overload and Greel to disintegrate. The Doctor then deactivates Mr Sin, before leaving with Leela in the TARDIS.

== Production ==
A Robert Banks Stewart story outline called The Foe from the Future inspired elements of this serial. The Foe from the Future was adapted by Big Finish Productions as an audio play in 2012. Working titles for this story included The Talons of Greel. This was the final Doctor Who story produced by Philip Hinchcliffe. His successor, Graham Williams, sat in on this story's production. This story featured John Nathan-Turner's first work as an uncredited production unit manager on the series, with the credit going to Chris D'Oyly-John. Nathan-Turner would become the series' regular production unit manager under Williams and succeed Williams as the show's producer from 1980 to 1989.

The Talons of Weng-Chiang featured two separate blocks of location shooting. As planned, the serial was to have a week of location filming for the exterior footage, which took place at various locations in London, with the majority in the area around Wapping, in mid-December 1976, followed by three studio recording sessions. Producer Philip Hinchcliffe was able to negotiate the swapping of one of the planned studio sessions for the use of an outside broadcast video crew, which led to the second block of location shooting in early January 1977, encompassing a week in Northampton, the majority of which was spent at the Royal Theatre.

A large pile of straw seen in one scene was placed there to cover a modern car that had not been moved off the street. The production team briefly considered giving Jago and Litefoot their own spin-off series, though this never came to fruition.

The production of this serial featured in a BBC 2 documentary, Whose Doctor Who (1977), presented by Melvyn Bragg, which was part of the arts series The Lively Arts. Including interviews with Tom Baker, Philip Hinchcliffe and fans of the series, it was the first in-depth documentary made by the BBC on the series and was transmitted on the day following the final episode. The programme is included as an extra on the DVD releases of The Talons of Weng-Chiang.

=== Cast notes ===
Deep Roy, who played Mr. Sin, had an uncredited role as an unnamed alien trade delegate in The Trial of a Time Lord: Mindwarp (1986). Dudley Simpson—who composed much of the music for Doctor Who in the 1960s and 1970s—has a cameo as the conductor of Jago's theatre orchestra. Michael Spice appears in this story as the main villain, Magnus Greel. He also provided the voice of Morbius in the previous season's The Brain of Morbius (1976). John Bennett had previously appeared in Doctor Who as General Finch in Invasion of the Dinosaurs (1974). Christopher Benjamin had previously appeared in Inferno (1970) as Sir Keith Gold and would return to play Colonel Hugh in "The Unicorn and the Wasp" (2008).

== Broadcast and reception ==
Episode	Title	Run time	Original release date	UK viewers (millions)
1	"Part One"	24:44	26 February 1977	11.3
2	"Part Two"	24:26	5 March 1977	9.8
3	"Part Three"	21:56	12 March 1977	10.2
4	"Part Four"	24:30	19 March 1977	11.4
5	"Part Five"	24:49	26 March 1977	10.1
6	"Part Six"	23:26	2 April 1977	9.3

Paul Cornell, Martin Day, and Keith Topping, in The Discontinuity Guide (1995), praised the double act of Jago and Litefoot and called the serial "One of the great moments of Doctor Who history – an effortless conquering of the pseudo-historical genre with a peerless script." In The Television Companion (1998), David J. Howe and Stephen James Walker were full of similar praise for the script, direction, the characters, and acting. Patrick Mulkern of Radio Times awarded it five stars out of five and wrote, "The Talons of Weng-Chiang as a whole is a scriptwriting tour de force. With its theatrical milieu, florid dramatis personae and high horror quotient, it makes for Doctor Who at its most blatantly Grand Guignol." The A.V. Club reviewer Christopher Bahn wrote that the story was good at "genre-blending" and homages. In Doctor Who: The Complete Guide, Mark Campbell awarded it seven out of ten, describing it as "groaning under the weight of so much clichéd Victoriana, Talons emerges as a garish hybrid of science fiction and literary pastiche. If watched in one go, the lack of subtlety can be draining."

In 2008, The Daily Telegraph named the serial the best of the "10 greatest episodes of Doctor Who" up to that point, writing, "The top-notch characterisation, direction and performances, with Tom Baker at the top of his game, make this the perfect Doctor Who story." This story was voted the best Doctor Who story ever in the 2003 Outpost Gallifrey poll to mark the series' 40th anniversary, narrowly beating The Caves of Androzani. In Doctor Who Magazine's 2009 "Mighty 200" poll, asking readers to rank all of the then-released 200 stories, The Talons of Weng-Chiang came in fourth place. In a similar poll in 2014, magazine readers ranked the episode in sixth place. Russell T Davies, lead writer and executive producer for Doctor Who from 2005–2010 and 2023–2025, praised this serial, saying, "Take The Talons of Weng-Chiang, for example. Watch episode one. It's the best dialogue ever written. It's up there with Dennis Potter. By a man called Robert Holmes. When the history of television drama comes to be written, Robert Holmes won't be remembered at all because he only wrote genre stuff. And that, I reckon, is a real tragedy."

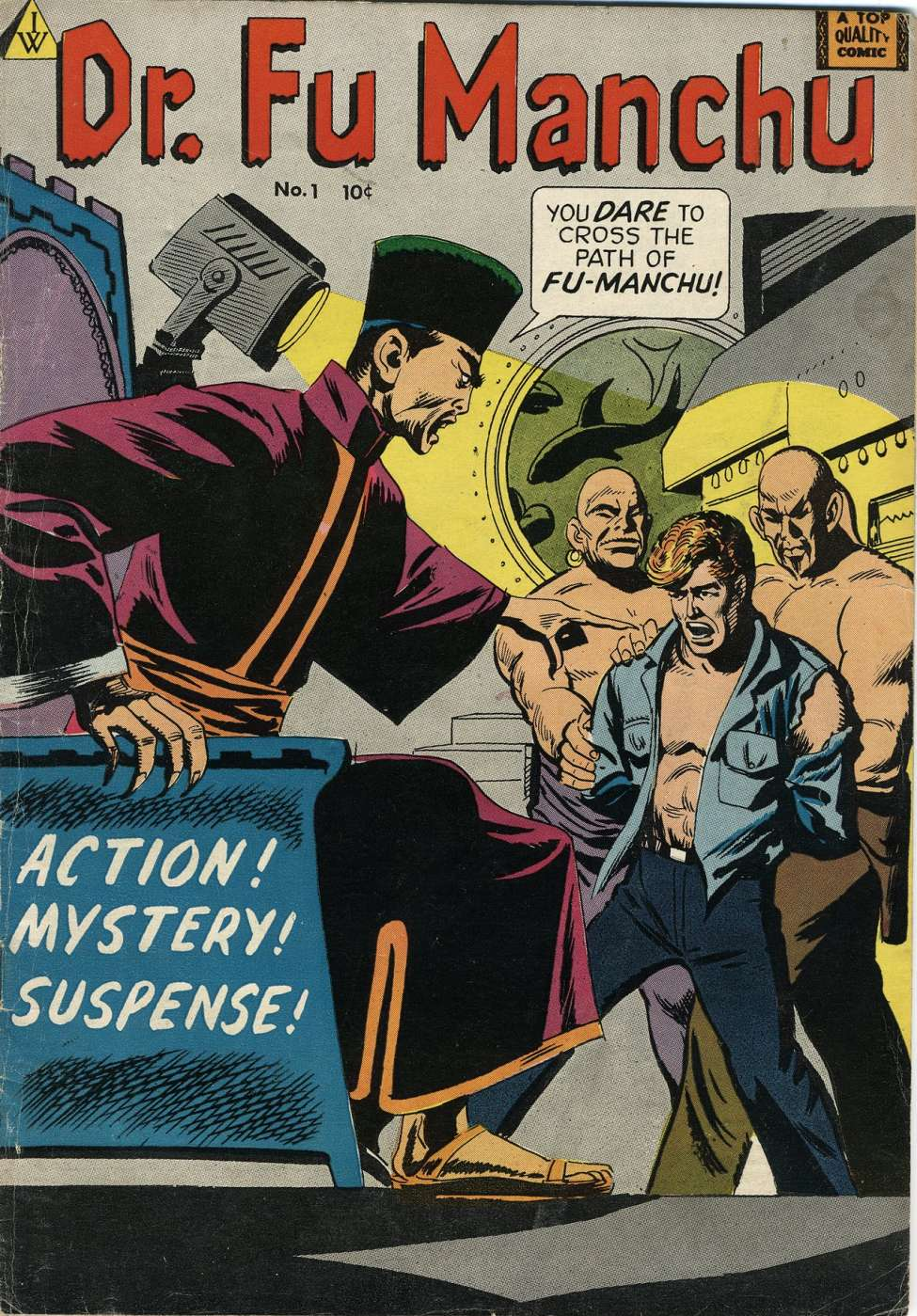
The serial's portrayal of Chinese characters, such as an antagonist reminiscent of Fu Manchu, generated criticism and controversy.

Although the script and the general production of the serial has been highly praised, some commentators have criticised elements of it such as the realisation of the giant rat and the depiction of the Chinese characters. Patrick Mulkern, in his Radio Times review, acknowledged the "wretched realisation of the giant rat". In his volume of British history State of Emergency, Dominic Sandbrook calls the giant rat "one of the worst-realised monsters not merely in the show's history, but in the history of human entertainment." Howe and Walker noted that its flaw was the realisation of the giant rat, though the story "still contains its fair share of gruesome and disturbing material". Future Doctor Who executive producer Steven Moffat said in 1995: "How could a good hack think that the BBC could make a giant rat? If he'd come to my house when I was 14 and said 'Can BBC Special Effects do a giant rat?' I'd have said no. I'd rather see them do something limited than something crap. What I resented was having to go to school two days later, and my friends knew I watched this show. They'd go 'Did you see the giant rat?!' and I'd have to say I thought there was dramatic integrity elsewhere."

The depiction of Chinese characters and culture, and use of yellowface in the serial, has been criticised as racist. Some of the English characters display racist attitudes towards the Chinese characters, which go unchallenged by the Doctor, who normally stands up for marginalised groups. Meanwhile, the Chinese immigrants themselves are portrayed in a stereotypical fashion – other than Li H'sen Chang (a major villain who is himself akin to Fu Manchu, but portrayed by a white actor – another source of criticism), all of the Chinese characters are coolies or members of Tong gangs. The Chinese Canadian National Council for Equality characterised the content of the episodes as "dangerous, offensive, racist stereotyping [which] associate the Chinese with everything fearful and despicable". As a result of their complaint to TVOntario, the Canadian channel chose not to broadcast all six episodes of the serial. Christopher Bahn wrote, "If it wasn't for the uncomfortably racist aspects of the story, it'd be close to perfection." In 2013, Digital Spy placed it in the Top 10 of Doctor Who, while commenting that "Holmes's desire to reflect the UK's 1970s fascination with mysticism and the martial arts led to a rather unfortunate depiction of Asian culture." In 2020, streaming service BritBox added trigger warnings to the serial after the suitability of continuing to host it on the service was called into question by viewers. It was also the subject of a discussion focusing on the representation of ethnicity on archive TV at the British Film Institute.

== Commercial releases ==
=== In print ===
Doctor Who and the Talons of Weng-Chiang
- Author: Terrance Dicks
- Cover artist: Jeff Cummins
- Series: Doctor Who book: Target novelisations
- Release number: 61
- Publisher: Target Books
- Publication date: 15 November 1977
- ISBN: 0-426-11973-8

A novelisation of this serial, written by Terrance Dicks, was published by Target Books in November 1977, entitled Doctor Who and The Talons of Weng-Chiang.

The script was published by Titan Books in November 1989, entitled "Doctor Who – The Scripts: The Talons of Weng-Chiang" and edited by John McElroy.

=== Home media ===
The BBC originally intended to release The Talons fo Weng-Chiang in omnibus format on VHS in the UK in autumn 1985, but postponed it after feedback from the British Board of Film Classification (BBFC), to whom it was submitted for an age certificate. Although the BBC requested the broadest U category, the BBFC found issue with scenes of murder, gore, drug references and illegal weaponry and entry; one examiner lamented Li H'sen being threatened with a meat cleaver and compared the sight of the bound and gagged Leela struggling against her bonds to the rejected erotica film Bamboo Dolls House (1973), while another felt the portrayal of Chinese characters was racist and that the submission was insensitive in light of the recent success of Year of the Dragon (1985). Chief among the Board's issues was the portrayal of imitable techniques; they demanded cuts be made to the fight scene between the Doctor and the Tong of the Black Scorpion to remove the use of the nunchaku (or chain-sticks), which were at the time classed as illegal weapons in the UK and could not be shown on-screen — a ruling which has since changed. Additionally, they demanded the removal of a sequence showing the Doctor breaking into Weng-Chiang's lair with a technique shown in detail. Removal of these scenes would have secured the serial a PG rating, rather than the stricter 15.

The serial was released in uncut form in Australia in 1987 (with a broad G certificate) and the United States in 1988. Following this, the BBC reinitiated plans to release the serial in the UK and resubmitted it to BBFC for a British certificate. Only one of the two cuts required in 1985 had been made to the new submission, namely the removal of the nunchaku sequence. Although the BBFC noted the absence of the second requested cut, to the forced entry scene, they allowed it to remain intact and the video was finally released in the UK in November 1988, with a PG rating and eleven seconds of cuts.

The story was released in complete and unedited episodic format on DVD in April 2003 in a two-disc set as part of the Doctor Who 40th Anniversary Celebration releases, representing the Tom Baker years. On 2 September 2008, this serial was released for sale on iTunes. A special edition version of the story was released on DVD as part of the "Revisitations 1" box set in October 2010.
