= The Hand of Fear =

087 – The Hand of Fear
- Doctor Who serial

Cast
- Doctor: Tom Baker – Fourth Doctor
- Companion: Elisabeth Sladen – Sarah Jane Smith
- Others: Judith Paris – Eldrad; Stephen Thorne – Kastrian Eldrad; Roy Pattison – Zazzka; Roy Skelton – King Rokon; Rex Robinson – Dr. Carter; Glyn Houston – Professor Watson; Frances Pidgeon – Miss Jackson; John Cannon – Elgin; Roy Boyd – Driscoll; David Purcell – Abbott; Renu Setna – Intern; Robin Hargrave – Guard

Production
- Directed by: Lennie Mayne
- Written by: Bob Baker; Dave Martin
- Script editor: Robert Holmes
- Produced by: Philip Hinchcliffe
- Executive producer: None
- Music by: Dudley Simpson
- Production code: 4N
- Series: Season 14
- Running time: 4 episodes, 25 minutes each
- First broadcast: 2 October 1976
- Last broadcast: 23 October 1976

Chronology
← Preceded by The Masque of Mandragora	Followed by → The Deadly Assassin

The Hand of Fear is the second serial of the 14th season of the British science fiction television series Doctor Who, which was first broadcast in four weekly parts on BBC1 from 2 to 23 October 1976. The serial was the last regular appearance of Elisabeth Sladen in the role of Sarah Jane Smith in Doctor Who.

The serial is set at a British nuclear power station and on the planet Kastria. In the serial, the alien Kastrian Eldrad (Judith Paris and Stephen Thorne) seeks to regrow their nearly-obliterated body with radiation so they can enact revenge on their people.

== Plot ==
150 million years ago on the planet Kastria, a criminal named Eldrad is sentenced to death for his crimes, including the destruction of solar wind barriers. The pod containing Eldrad is obliterated—but his hand survives. In the present day, the Doctor and Sarah Jane Smith arrive in the TARDIS at a quarry and are caught up in an explosion. Sarah is trapped under the rubble and makes contact with the fossilised hand, its ring placing her under its control. The Doctor takes her to the local hospital, where the mesmeric power of the hand becomes more complete.

Sarah heads for a nuclear generator, the Nunton Complex, where she breaks into the reactor with the hand. It begins to regenerate in the radiation, moving around unaided. The head of the complex, Professor Watson, remains at his post when the reactor goes critical. He offers the Doctor aid and advice in trying to get to Sarah. Eventually the Doctor reaches Sarah and knocks her down, but not before the hand has absorbed a significant amount of radiation. The hand's ring next takes over a nuclear operative Driscoll, who is manipulated into bringing the hand into the reactor core while everyone else flees. Eldrad regenerates into a fully humanoid form in the reactor. Finding herself in a female form, Eldrad convinces the Doctor to take her back to Kastria, explaining that she created the solar barriers that enabled her people to thrive, claiming that they were destroyed in an interstellar war.

The Doctor, Sarah and Eldrad travel in the TARDIS to Kastria in the present time. They find a barren and frozen world, with a few signs of civilisation many floors below ground. Eldrad is seemingly caught and destroyed by one of a series of traps while travelling with the Doctor to a regeneration chamber. Eldrad emerges in his true masculine form and then commences a tirade against King Rokon upon seeing a hologram of him. Admitting that he destroyed the barriers during his attempt to usurp the Kastrian leadership, Eldrad finds the remains of Rokon and learns that the Kastrian race accepted extinction over living a miserable existence underground, destroying their race banks in case Eldrad returned. When Eldrad decides to make his new empire on Earth, the Doctor trips the would-be tyrant into an abyss, then throws the ring into it to ensure he cannot regenerate.

Not long after departure in the TARDIS, Sarah becomes fed up after everything they have been through together and, after she states her intention to leave, goes off to pack. The Doctor receives a telepathic summons to Gallifrey and declares he cannot take Sarah with him. This news upsets her, as her threat was unserious. The Doctor returns her to Earth where she tells the Doctor not to forget her. As the TARDIS dematerialises, Sarah realises that the Doctor has not left her in South Croydon as planned.

== Production ==
When Sladen announced her intention to leave the series, Sarah was originally supposed to be killed off in a pseudo-historical story involving aliens and the French Foreign Legion. Douglas Camfield, who was supposed to write the scripts, was unavailable to do so, however. This was much to Sladen's relief, as she did not want Sarah to be killed or married off. Sladen also asked that Sarah's departure not be the main focus of the story, as she felt the programme was about the Doctor, not the companion. Baker and Martin intentionally did not write Sarah's departure scene. Instead, the script for that scene was rewritten by Sladen and Tom Baker based upon Robert Holmes' original version.

The original script for the story featured an ageing Brigadier Lethbridge Stewart, who had been moved from UNIT to the Extraterrestrial Xenological Intelligence Taskforce to study UFO activities. He was to be killed when he steered his spaceship into an Omegan kamikaze ship to prevent that ship from crashing into Earth. This was not filmed due to Nicholas Courtney being unavailable. The original script also featured Harry Sullivan. and Miss Jackson was a nameless male. Director Lennie Mayne built up the part, changed the gender, and cast his wife Frances Pidgeon in the role. Eldrad's home was originally identified as the black hole Omega 4.6. When Robert Holmes pointed out to Bob Baker and Dave Martin that the name Omega had already appeared in Doctor Who (in The Three Doctors; this story was also written by Baker and Martin), they changed the name to Kastria.

A real-life quarry explosion was filmed for the episode. A rumour persisted for many years that a camera was totally destroyed in the blast. The DVD commentary makes clear that this was a fan myth. The nuclear power station was originally supposed to be the Nuton Power Complex of The Claws of Axos but was renamed the Nunton Experimental Complex instead. The real-life location was the Oldbury Nuclear Power Station in Gloucestershire. Nearby Thornbury was used for the closing scene.

In the final scene, Sarah whistles the tune "Daddy Wouldn't Buy Me a Bow Wow". Since Sladen was unable to whistle, director Lennie Mayne provided the whistling while Sladen mimed to it.

== Broadcast and reception ==
Episode	Title	Run time	Original release date	UK viewers (millions)
1	"Part One"	24:50	2 October 1976	10.5
2	"Part Two"	24:48	9 October 1976	10.2
3	"Part Three"	24:22	16 October 1976	11.1
4	"Part Four"	25:00	23 October 1976	12.0

The episodes were broadcast on BBC Four on 9 and 10 May 2011 as a tribute to Elisabeth Sladen who had died on 19 April that year. The repeat viewing figures were 1.0, 1.2, 0.9 & 1.3 million respectively.

Paul Cornell, Martin Day, and Keith Topping wrote in The Discontinuity Guide (1995) that the serial was "engaging and well-acted", particularly praising Sladen. However, they noted that "It all goes a bit pear shaped in the final episode, with Stephen Thorne doing his best Brian Blessed impersonation and Eldrad eventually tripping over the Doctor's scarf." In The Television Companion (1998), David J. Howe and Stephen James Walker praised Sladen and Judith Paris as the female Eldrad, but criticised Stephen Thorne as the male Eldrad, who seemed too similar to his previous character Omega from The Three Doctors (1972–73). In 2010, Mark Braxton of Radio Times was positive towards the location filming and the female Eldrad, but criticised Kastria and felt that the last episode was "a protracted preamble" to Sarah's departure. DVD Talk's Stuart Galbraith gave The Hand of Fear three out of five stars, saying that while the female Eldrad was effective, the story was "all over the map" and ran out of steam near the end, with the fourth episode being "largely a disaster".

== Commercial releases ==
=== In print ===
Doctor Who and the Hand of Fear
- Author: Terrance Dicks
- Cover artist: Roy Knipe
- Series: Doctor Who book: Target novelisations
- Release number: 30
- Publisher: Target Books
- ISBN: 0-426-20033-0

A novelisation of this serial, written by Terrance Dicks, was published by Target Books in January 1979.

=== Home media ===
This serial was released on VHS in February 1996. The story was released as a Region 2 DVD on 24 July 2006. It was released in Region 1 on 7 November 2006. It was re-released with new outer packaging on 2 July 2007.

It, along with all the other serials of the season, was released on blu-ray with new sound and visual restoration, all previous DVD extras and new extra content (created specially for the set) on Monday 4 May 2020 as "Doctor Who - The Collection Season 14".

== Bibliography ==
- Cornell, Paul; Day, Martin; Topping, Keith (1995). "The Hand of Fear". The Discontinuity Guide. London: Virgin Books. pp. 196–199. ISBN 0-426-20442-5. Archived from the original on 12 March 2007.
- Haining, Peter Doctor Who: 25 Glorious Years W H Allen (1988) ISBN 1-85227-021-7
