= Chris Boucher (writer) =

British writer (1943–2022)

- Born: Christopher Franklin Boucher; 15 February 1943; Maldon, Essex, England
- Died: 11 December 2022 (aged 79)
- Education: University of Essex
- Occupations: Screenwriter, script editor, novelist
- Spouse: Lynda Macklin (m. 1966)
- Children: 3

Christopher Franklin Boucher (15 February 1943 – 11 December 2022) was an English television screenwriter, script editor and novelist. He is known for his frequent contributions to two genres, science fiction and crime fiction, and worked on the series Doctor Who, Blake's 7, Shoestring, Bergerac, and The Bill. He also created the series Star Cops.

== Early life ==
Boucher was born on 15 February 1943 in Maldon, Essex, the only child of Simpson and Alexandra Boucher (née Wheeler). He was educated at Maldon Grammar School. Prior to becoming a television writer, Boucher worked at Calor Gas as a management trainee and gained a Bachelor of Arts in economics at the University of Essex.

== Career ==
Boucher began his work in television science fiction for the series Doctor Who, writing the serials The Face of Evil, The Robots of Death and Image of the Fendahl (all broadcast in 1977). Prior to his death in 2022, he was the last remaining living Doctor Who scriptwriter from prior to Season 18 in 1980. One of his contributions to Doctor Who was the creation of the companion Leela (Louise Jameson), the savage who featured in the series from 1977 to 1978. The character was inspired by the Palestinian terrorist Leila Khaled. Boucher was commissioned for the programme by script editor Robert Holmes, who suggested that Boucher should be appointed in that role for the science fiction series Blake's 7 (1978–81). He served in this role for the entirety of its four-series run, and also wrote several episodes himself, including the final episode.

Boucher was the script editor of the second series of the TV drama Shoestring in 1980, which followed the investigations of private detective and radio show host Eddie Shoestring (Trevor Eve). Following the end of Blake's 7, Boucher script-edited and wrote for the third series of the police drama Juliet Bravo in 1982. He then moved on to script-edit another detective show, Bergerac, working on the programme from 1983 to 1987.

All of the above programmes were produced in-house by the BBC and broadcast on the BBC1 network. For the ITV network, he worked on Thames Television's police drama series The Bill as script editor in 1987. In that year he also returned to the BBC to create his own series, Star Cops, which combined the science fiction and crime genres. The series encountered several production problems and was not a ratings success, lasting only nine episodes on BBC2, but has maintained a cult following among fans of science fiction.

Later works included several Doctor Who novels for BBC Books, all featuring the character of Leela, and a series of straight-to-CD full-cast audio dramas entitled Kaldor City, which combine elements from his Doctor Who serial The Robots of Death with his Blake's 7 work.

== Views and advocacy ==
Boucher was an avowed atheist. He disapproved of the introduction of religion into government policy and the education of children.

== Personal life and death ==
Boucher married Lynda Macklin in 1966. They had three sons: Luke, Nathan and Daniel.

Boucher died on 11 December 2022, aged 79. He was the last surviving Doctor Who scriptwriter from prior to the 1980s.

== Writing credits ==
Production	Notes	Broadcaster
Braden's Week	"Episode #2.1" (1969)	BBC1
The Saturday Crowd	"Episode #1.6" (1969); "Episode #2.10" (1969); "Episode #2.12" (1969)	ITV
That's Life!	"Episode #1.1" (1973)	BBC1
Dave Allen at Large	"Episode #3.4" (1973); "Episode #4.1" (1975)	BBC1
Romany Jones	"Run Rabbit Run" (1973); "The Invitations" (1974)	ITV
Slater's Day	Television film (1974)	ITV
Doctor Who	The Face of Evil (1977); The Robots of Death (1977); Image of the Fendahl (1977)	BBC1
Shoestring	"The Dangerous Game" (1980)	BBC1
Blake's 7	Script editor for all 52 episodes (1978–1981) Wrote: "Shadow" (1979); "Weapon" (1979); "Trial" (1979); "Star One" (1979); "City at the Edge of the World" (1980); "Rumours of Death" (1980); "Death-Watch" (1980); "Rescue" (1981); "Blake" (1981)	BBC1
Juliet Bravo	"Where There's Muck..." (1982)	BBC1
Bergerac	"Fires in the Fall" (1986); "The Memory Man" (1987)	BBC1
Star Cops	Created series (1987); Wrote: "An Instinct for Murder"; "Conversations with the Dead"; "Intelligent Listening for Beginners"; "Trivial Games and Paranoid Pursuits"; "Little Green Men and Other Martians";	BBC2
Home James!	"Never Say Die" (1990)	ITV
The Bill	"Lying in Wait" (1990)	ITV

== Novels ==
- 1998: Doctor Who: Last Man Running
- 1999: Doctor Who: Corpse Marker
- 2001: Doctor Who: Psi-ence Fiction
- 2005: Doctor Who: Match of the Day
