= Philip Hinchcliffe =

British retired producer and screenwriter (born 1944)

- Born: Philip Michael Hinchcliffe; 1 October 1944 (age 82); Dewsbury, Yorkshire, England
- Education: University of Cambridge
- Occupations: Television producer, screenwriter, script editor
- Years active: 1968–2001, 2021
- Spouse: Deirdre Hanefey (m. 1970)
- Children: Celina Hinchcliffe (born 1976)

Philip Michael Hinchcliffe (born 1 October 1944) is a retired English television producer, screenwriter and script editor. After graduating from Cambridge University, he began his career as a writer and script editor at Associated Television before joining the BBC to produce Doctor Who in one of its most popular eras from 1974 to 1977. In 2010, Hinchcliffe was chosen by Den of Geek as the best ever producer of the series.

Following Doctor Who, Hinchcliffe remained with the BBC as a producer for several years, working on series such as Private Schulz (1981), before launching a freelance career in the mid-1980s, which included making Bust and The Charmer (both 1987) for London Weekend Television. He finished his career as an executive producer for Scottish Television, with his final credit on Take Me (2001).

== Background and early work ==
Hinchcliffe was born in Dewsbury, Yorkshire. He was educated at Slough Grammar School and Pembroke College, Cambridge, where he studied English literature. After a brief period working for a travel company and then as a teacher, he joined Associated Television in 1968, writing episodes for series including the soap opera Crossroads (1970). He then served as script editor of the sitcom Alexander the Greatest (1971–72), the children's adventure series The Jensen Code (1973) and the children's drama series The Kids from 47A (1973). He also became an associate producer on General Hospital.

== Doctor Who ==
Hinchcliffe's agent and contacts from his time as a script editor won him the position as the new producer of the BBC's Doctor Who. In Spring 1974, at the age of 29, he was approached by the corporation's head of serials to take his first full production job, initially trailing and then succeeding long-serving producer Barry Letts. Although he trailed Letts on Tom Baker's first story, Robot, he was first credited on The Ark in Space. Throughout his first year he was mostly producing scripts that had been commissioned by the previous production team prior to their departure.

Hinchcliffe and script editor Robert Holmes ushered in a change in tone for the series, which became darker and more adult than previously, with a gothic atmosphere influenced by the horror films produced by Hammer Film Productions. This horror influence is especially evident in serials like Planet of Evil, Pyramids of Mars, The Brain of Morbius, The Hand of Fear and The Talons of Weng-Chiang, all of which have content which directly recalls well known horror novels and movies. Hinchcliffe also aspired to give the programme a more literary feel with a stronger science fiction basis. Working closely with Holmes, Hinchcliffe tried to "tighten the whole storytelling up a bit and pay more attention to the design", but he conceded that it was improved "in some stories more than others". As part of the effort to "tighten" the storytelling they were permitted to reduce the number of six-parters to just one a season (the previous team of Barry Letts and Terrance Dicks made three six-parters per season in their last three seasons).

Hinchcliffe was reluctant to use characters and monsters from the series' past: the Daleks, the Cybermen and the Sontarans only appeared once during his tenure, and these stories were commissioned by Barry Letts. The Master and the Time Lords returned for one adventure, The Deadly Assassin, at the suggestion of script editor Robert Holmes, but were portrayed very differently from their previous appearances. The character of Brigadier Lethbridge-Stewart and the United Nations Intelligence Taskforce made their final regular appearances in Hinchcliffe's second season.

The early Tom Baker era of the series is cited by Screenonline as the peak of Doctor Who in its first run. However, the BBC received several complaints from Mary Whitehouse of the National Viewers' and Listeners' Association that the series was unduly frightening for children and could traumatise them. The NVALA had been critical of the series before but the complaints reached their height in the Hinchcliffe period. Her strongest criticism was for The Deadly Assassin, where an attempt is made to drown the Doctor at the end of an episode. While the BBC publicly defended the programme, after three seasons Hinchcliffe was moved onto the adult police thriller series Target in 1977, and his replacement Graham Williams, who had created Target, was specifically instructed to lighten the tone of the storylines and reduce violence. Screenonline states that this resulted in "the start of an erratic decline in both popularity and quality" for Doctor Who which led to its eventual cancellation.

Hinchcliffe also wrote three novelisations of Doctor Who serials for Target Books, adapting the William Hartnell era story The Keys of Marinus, as well as two stories from his own era, The Seeds of Doom and The Masque of Mandragora.

== Subsequent career ==
After leaving Doctor Who, Hinchcliffe worked on numerous series, single dramas and films. He produced Target, Private Schulz, Nancy Astor and Strangers and Brothers for the BBC, before leaving the corporation to produce Bust and The Charmer for London Weekend Television. He stepped down from the producer role after working on the feature films An Awfully Big Adventure and Total Eclipse (both 1995), but was engaged as an executive producer by Scottish Television from 1998 to 2001, overseeing series including Taggart, the John Hannah episodes of Rebus, and Take Me (2001).

Hinchcliffe has made numerous appearances on DVD releases of Doctor Who serials made during his time as producer. The documentary Serial Thrillers, included on the Pyramids of Mars DVD release, focuses on his three-year reign as producer in depth, examining what made the show so successful during that period. In 2012, Life After Who: Philip Hinchcliffe was included on The Android Invasion DVD release, in which his daughter Celina Hinchcliffe interviewed him about his career in British television and film after his work on Doctor Who.

In 2021, Hinchcliffe came out of retirement, returning to Doctor Who to help Big Finish Productions produce audio dramas based on "lost" story ideas from his era on Doctor Who.

== Personal life ==
Hinchcliffe married Deirdre Hanefey in 1970 and has two children. His daughter, Celina Hinchcliffe (born 1976), is a television presenter, primarily on sports programmes.

Preceded by Barry Letts	Doctor Who Producer; 1975–77	Succeeded by Graham Williams
