= Robert Holmes (scriptwriter) =

British screenwriter (1926–1986)

- Born: Robert Colin Holmes; 2 April 1926; Tring, Hertfordshire, England
- Died: 24 May 1986 (aged 60); Oxford, Oxfordshire, England
- Occupations: Television scriptwriter, script editor
- Known for: Doctor Who

Robert Colin Holmes (2 April 1926 – 24 May 1986) was a British television scriptwriter. For over 25 years, he contributed to some of the most popular programmes screened in the UK. He is particularly remembered for his work on science fiction programmes, most notably his extensive contributions to Doctor Who, which included working as its script editor from 1974 to 1977.

Holmes suffered ill health from the early 1980s. He died in May 1986 while working on scripts for the second and final Sixth Doctor season The Trial of a Time Lord; his last serial as sole writer, The Mysterious Planet, and The Ultimate Foe, of which he only wrote the first part (the second being completed by Pip and Jane Baker), were released posthumously between September and December 1986.

== Early career ==
In 1944, at the age of 18, Holmes joined the army, fighting with the Queen's Own Cameron Highlanders regiment in Burma. He rapidly earned a commission, and as such became the youngest commissioned officer in the entire British army during the Second World War. The fact that he lied about his age to get into the army was discovered at his commissioning, but apparently the only reaction was by a general who praised him, adding that he had done the same thing himself.

Soon after the end of the war, Holmes returned to England and left the army, deciding to join the police. He trained at Hendon Police College, graduating the top of his year and joining the Metropolitan Police in London, serving at Bow Street Police Station.

It was whilst serving as a police officer that Holmes first began to develop an interest in writing as a career. When giving evidence in court for prosecutions against offenders, he would often note the excitement and frantic work of the journalists reporting on the cases, and decided that he would like to do similar work. To this end, he taught himself shorthand in his spare time and eventually resigned from the Police force.

Holmes quickly found work writing for both local and national newspapers, initially in London and later in the Midlands. He also filed reports for the Press Association, which could be syndicated to a variety of sources, such as local or foreign newspapers. In the late 1950s he worked for a time writing and editing short stories for magazines, before receiving his first break in television when he contributed an episode to the famous medical series Emergency – Ward 10 (1957).

== Television ==
Holmes found himself working almost exclusively in television drama after 1957. He began contributing episodes regularly to the adventure series Knight Errant before becoming that programme's story editor in 1959. He wrote several episodes of another medical drama, Dr. Finlay's Casebook, before in the early 1960s writing for a range of crime-related dramas: Dixon of Dock Green, The Saint, Ghost Squad, Public Eye and Intrigue all dealt with law enforcement, and benefiting from Holmes' real-life experiences.

In 1965 Holmes began writing in the science fiction genre when he contributed scripts to Undermind, a body-snatching drama from ITV. He also worked in film once, storylining the movie Invasion, several elements from which would later crop up in his 1970 Doctor Who serial Spearhead from Space, and which had also been inspired by Nigel Kneale's 1955 Quatermass II serial.

== Doctor Who ==
In 1965 Holmes wrote on-spec an idea for a stand-alone science-fiction serial entitled The Space Trap, which he submitted to the BBC. The Head of Drama Serials wrote back to Holmes, informing him that they were no longer interested in producing such serials, but that he might have better luck if he tried submitting it to the Doctor Who production office. This he did, and had a fruitful meeting with the show's then story editor Donald Tosh; but when Tosh left the programme shortly afterwards, the script was forgotten and Holmes moved on to other projects.

In 1968, after some work on other projects appeared to be falling through, Holmes decided on the off-chance to re-submit The Space Trap to the Doctor Who office, and again found a favourable response, this time from Assistant Script Editor Terrance Dicks, who developed it with Holmes to cover the eventuality of an agreed script falling through. At the beginning of the sixth season, there was no slot available for Holmes' script, but the production staff began experiencing a number of problems with scheduled scripts. The Dominators, the first story in the season, ended one episode earlier, resulting in an extra episode being tacked onto the following story, The Mind Robber. When the fourth six-part storyline fell through, the story before was extended by two episodes while Dicks worked with Holmes to adapt The Krotons to fill the rest of the gap in the schedule.

The story was regarded as a success by the production team, who quickly commissioned Holmes to write a second story for the season, The Space Pirates. This was originally planned to be four episodes long but was extended to become a six-parter when another story fell through. Holmes and Dicks got on very well, so when Dicks officially took over as script editor he frequently turned to Holmes for contributions.

Holmes wrote Jon Pertwee's debut serial as the Third Doctor, Spearhead from Space, in 1970. During the early 1970s he also wrote for another BBC science-fiction show, Doomwatch, as well as other programmes such as the ATV series Spyder's Web.

Holmes was commissioned to write the first story of season eight in 1971, Terror of the Autons. The story was considered a great success. Holmes would go on to contribute two more stories in 1973, Carnival of Monsters and The Time Warrior. Holmes introduced two recurring alien races to Doctor Who: the Autons and the Sontarans. Terrance Dicks intended to have Holmes replace him as script editor after he left. Holmes accepted the offer while the season was still in production, editing (uncredited) Death to the Daleks.

Holmes was known for his morbid sense of humour and his inclination to write dark and disturbing material. The previous producer Barry Letts often had Holmes tone down his writing, but Letts' successor Philip Hinchcliffe wanted to take the programme in a darker and more dynamic direction along with the introduction of its new lead actor, Tom Baker.

Holmes continued as script editor for the next three years, seeing Doctor Who through one of its most successful eras in terms of both viewing figures and critical acclaim. Despite this, a number of stories came under fire from Mary Whitehouse of the National Viewers' and Listeners' Association for their alleged excessive violence or frightening tone. Some of the most controversial stories were written by Holmes himself. A scene from Holmes' story The Deadly Assassin, in which the Fourth Doctor's head is held under water as the cliffhanger, led to BBC Director General Sir Charles Curran apologising to Mary Whitehouse for the offence caused. On 11 February 1977, the Daily Express published an interview with Holmes by Jean Rook under the title "Who do you think you are, scaring my innocent child?", in which Holmes said "Parents would be terribly irresponsible to leave a six-year-old to watch it alone. It's geared to the intelligent fourteen-year-old, and I wouldn't let any child under ten see it." The scene was removed from the master tape, and was absent from all rebroadcasts and home releases of the story until it was restored from home recordings for the DVD release.

During this time, Holmes wrote three of his own credited stories for the programme, performed complete ground-up rewrites on at least two other stories (which were broadcast under pseudonyms) and had a strong hand in almost every other script. It was very much his era of the show, although by 1977 he felt that he had done all he could for the programme. He had intended to leave at the end of the fourteenth season, but was persuaded to stay on for a short while by the new producer Graham Williams. While he script-edited the first two stories he commissioned for season 15, he left the third to his successor, Anthony Read. He also requested a last minute re-write so that K-9 would become an ongoing character. The difficult task of working him in was left to Read.

Nonetheless, Read was quick to turn to Holmes when it came to commissioning scripts for the sixteenth season, being keen to use writers who knew how the Doctor Who format was best used and could be relied upon to come up with usable scripts in good time. Holmes wrote two stories for the season, but after its broadcast in 1978, Holmes felt that he needed to distance himself from the programme. It would be six years before he wrote for Doctor Who again.

During this time he wrote for various series, including the BBC science-fiction show Blake's 7. When the series began in 1978, Holmes had been offered the Script Editor's post, but declined as he had only just finished the same role on Doctor Who and was not keen to go back to such strenuous work so quickly. Instead, he recommended that the producer hire Chris Boucher, a writer he'd used on Doctor Who — so it was Boucher who in turn commissioned Holmes to write for Blake's 7. One of the most notorious moments in the series occurred in Holmes' episode "Orbit" in the fourth season, when Avon stalks Vila in a shuttle wanting to throw him off the ship. Other programmes Holmes worked on in the late seventies and early eighties included the police series Juliet Bravo and an adaptation of the science-fiction novel Child of the Vodyoni, which was screened as The Nightmare Man in 1981. He also script-edited detective series Shoestring.

In 1983, the then-current Doctor Who production team of producer John Nathan-Turner and script editor Eric Saward contacted Holmes about returning to script the planned twentieth anniversary special, due for broadcast that November. Holmes agreed and began writing the script. However, he found it increasingly difficult to include the many elements from the show's past that Nathan-Turner had insisted on. After the rejection of his first outline, he eventually gave up on the assignment (the special was eventually scripted by Terrance Dicks). The ordeal did lead to a friendship between Saward and Holmes that would eventually lead to Holmes returning to the series for the following season.

When it came to writing the final story for the Fifth Doctor (played by Peter Davison), Saward commissioned Holmes to write the storyline as he felt that Holmes's experience would allow him to create an epic departure for Davison and introduction of the Sixth Doctor. The Caves of Androzani, as the 1984 story came to be titled, is widely regarded by fans as being one of the best in the programme's entire run from 1963 onwards, being voted "all-time number one" story in a 2009 poll. Holmes felt that Davison's adventures had been too easy, and decided to "put him through hell".

John Nathan-Turner wanted to shoot a story abroad for season 22, similar to previous seasons. The show's then US distributor Lionheart initially offered to co-fund filming in America. Holmes was commissioned to write the story which was originally set in New Orleans. However, Lionheart suddenly backed out, and a number of other locations were considered. The production team settled on shooting in Seville. Holmes found The Two Doctors a difficult story, as Nathan-Turner had insisted that the Sontarans appear in it. Like much of season 22, the story came under fire for violence and disturbing content. Holmes was a vegetarian, so many themes in the story were deliberately intended to represent his views about eating meat and slaughtering animals for consumption.

When Doctor Who returned from hiatus in 1986, a new 14-episode story entitled The Trial of a Time Lord was conceived to span the entire length of the season. Holmes was asked to write the first four-part segment of the season, which he subtitled The Mysterious Planet. Production of the season was far from smooth – the growing tension between Nathan-Turner and Saward, a lack of faith in the production from BBC executives and Holmes's own poor health made the process difficult.

Holmes was particularly upset at comments made by BBC drama executive Jonathan Powell regarding his opening four episodes. He eventually agreed to write the closing two episodes of the season. Holmes began writing the first episode, but died in May 1986 after a short illness. Eric Saward intervened and completed episode 13. Saward had agreed to write the final episode, but quickly left the production when he and Nathan-Turner were unable to agree on the ending. Nathan-Turner was forced to stand in as script editor while Pip and Jane Baker (who had written episodes nine through twelve) wrote episode 14.

Holmes' last work to be broadcast was an episode of the detective series Bergerac, another show script-edited by Chris Boucher, transmitted in 1987. He did little work outside of television, although he did novelize his script of The Two Doctors for Target Books in 1986. It was the 100th Doctor Who novelization published by Target Books.

== Legacy ==
Holmes's work on Doctor Who has been discussed in numerous DVD documentaries, most notably Behind the Sofa, produced by Richard Molesworth, which appears on the DVD release of The Two Doctors.

Holmes's friend, fellow TV writer Roger Marshall, argued that his work never received the acclaim it deserved because most of it was in series television as opposed to television plays or serials. According to Marshall: "In retrospect, he spent too much time tinkering around with lesser writers' work rather than getting on with his own."

Russell T Davies, head writer and producer for Doctor Who's 21st-century revival, stated Holmes' serial The Ark in Space as his favourite story from the original series. He said he considered Holmes to be comparable with the greatest screenwriters, describing the first episode of The Talons of Weng-Chiang as having "the best dialogue ever written. It's up there with Dennis Potter... When the history of television drama comes to be written, Robert Holmes won't be remembered at all because he only wrote genre stuff. And that, I reckon, is a real tragedy".

=== Doctor Who scripts ===
- The Krotons
- The Space Pirates
- Spearhead from Space
- Terror of the Autons
- Carnival of Monsters
- The Time Warrior
- The Ark in Space (from a story by John Lucarotti)
- Pyramids of Mars (from a story by Lewis Greifer)
- The Brain of Morbius (from a story by Terrance Dicks)
- The Hand of Fear (episode 1, uncredited)
- The Deadly Assassin
- The Talons of Weng-Chiang
- The Sun Makers
- The Ribos Operation
- The Power of Kroll
- The Caves of Androzani
- The Two Doctors
- The Mysterious Planet
- The Ultimate Foe (episode 1 only)

== Writing credits ==
Production	Notes	Broadcaster
Knight Errant Limited	"The King of Kandoga" (1960)	ITV
Deadline Midnight	"Man in a Frame" (1961)	ITV
Harpers West One	"Episode #2.14" (1962)	ITV
Ghost Squad	"The Green Shoes" (1962)	ITV
Emergency-Ward 10	33 episodes (1962–1963)	ITV
Dr. Finlay's Casebook	"The Hallelujah Stakes" (1964); "The Old Indomitable" (1964); "The Doctor Cried" (1964); "Charity, Dr. Finlay" (1965)	BBC1
Undermind	"Waves of Sound" (1965); "End Signal" (1965)	ITV
Invasion	Feature film (1966)	N/A
Intrigue	"Here's Something Else on the Button" (1966)	ABC Weekend TV
No Hiding Place	6 episodes (1965–1967)	ITV
Honey Lane	"The Matchmakers" (1968)	ITV
Public Eye	6 episodes (1965–1968)	ITV
Mr. Rose	"The Jolly Swagman" (1967); "The Unquiet Ghost" (1967); "The Frozen Swede" (1968)	ITV
Frontier	"Mutiny" (1968)	ABC
The Saint	"The Scales of Justice" (1968)	ITV
Doctor Who	19 serials comprising 73 episodes (1968-1971, 1973-1979, 1984-1986): The Krotons (1968); The Space Pirates (1969); Spearhead from Space (1970); Terror of the Autons (1971); Carnival of Monsters (1973); The Time Warrior (1973); The Ark in Space (1975); Pyramids of Mars (1975); The Brain of Morbius (1976); The Hand of Fear (1976) (episode 1, uncredited); The Deadly Assassin (1976); The Talons of Weng-Chiang (1977); The Sun Makers (1977); The Ribos Operation (1978); The Power of Kroll (1978); The Caves of Androzani (1984); The Two Doctors (1985); The Mysterious Planet (1986); The Ultimate Foe (1986) (only the first episode)	BBC1
The Inside Man	"The Spy Vanishes" (1969)	ITV
Fraud Squad	"Turbot on Ice" (1969); "Last Exit to Leichstenstein" (1969); "The Price of a Copper" (1970)	ITV
Doomwatch	"The Inquest" (1971)	BBC1
Trial	"Mister X" (1971)	BBC2
Spyder's Web	"Nobody's Strawberry Fool" (1972)	ITV
Dead of Night	"Return Flight" (1972)	BBC2
The Regiment	"Depot" (1973); "North West Frontier" (1973)	BBC1
Warship	"The Drop" (1973)	BBC1
Spy Trap	"A Perfect Victim" (1973)	BBC1
Dixon of Dock Green	"The Unwanted" (1974)	BBC1
Jukes of Piccadilly	"The Case of the Arabian Kidnap" (1980); "Dulverton Green" (1980)	ITV
BBC2 Playhouse	"Fothergill" (1981)	BBC2
The Nightmare Man	4 episodes (1981)	BBC1
Blake's 7	"Killer" (1979); "Gambit" (1979); "Traitor" (1981); "Orbit" (1981)	BBC1
Into the Labyrinth	"Shadrach" (1981); "Dr. Jekyll and Mrs. Hyde" (1982)	ITV
Juliet Bravo	"A Breach of the Peace" (1982)	BBC1
Miracles Take Longer	5 episodes (1984)	ITV
Timeslip	"Pilot" (1985)	ITV
Bergerac	"Prime Target" (1983); "A Cry in the Night" (1984); "Winner Takes All" (1987)	BBC1

== Awards and nominations ==
Year	Award	Work	Category	Result	Reference
1975	Writers' Guild of Great Britain Award	Doctor Who (shared with Malcolm Hulke, Terry Nation, Brian Hayles and Robert Sloman)	Best Children's Drama Script	Won	

Preceded by Terrance Dicks	Doctor Who Script Editor; 1974–77	Succeeded by Anthony Read
