= Doomwatch =

British science fiction TV series (1970–1972)

- Opening title card
- Created by: Kit Pedler; Gerry Davis
- Starring: John Paul; Joby Blanshard; Simon Oates; Vinien Sherrard; John Barron; Robert Powell; John Bown; Wendy Hall; John Nolan; Elizabeth Weaver
- Composer: Max Harris
- Country of origin: United Kingdom
- No. of episodes: 38 (14 missing)

Production
- Producer: Terence Dudley
- Running time: 50 minutes

Original release
- Network: BBC1
- Release: 9 February 1970 – 14 August 1972

Doomwatch is a British science fiction television programme produced by the BBC, which ran on BBC1 between 1970 and 1972. The series was set in the present day and dealt with a scientific government agency led by Doctor Spencer Quist (played by John Paul), responsible for investigating and combating environmental and technological dangers. The series was followed by a film adaptation produced by Tigon British Film Productions and released in 1972 and a revival TV film was broadcast on Channel 5 in 1999.

== Background ==
The programme was created by Gerry Davis and Kit Pedler, who had collaborated on scripts for Doctor Who, a programme on which, for a time during the late 1960s, Davis had been the story editor and Pedler the unofficial scientific adviser. Their interest in the problems of science changing and endangering human life had led them to create the popular cyborg villains the Cybermen for that programme. Similar interests led them to create Doomwatch, which explored new and unusual threats to the human race, many bred out of the fear of real scientific concepts, with a "this could happen to us" angle.

== Synopsis ==
The formal name of the protagonist's organisation was "Department for the Observation and Measurement of Scientific Work". Officially, Doomwatch was an agency dedicated to preserving the world from dangers of unprincipled scientific research. In the words of one character, "We were set up to investigate any scientific research, public or private, which could possibly be harmful to man". Its intended purpose was to form a body with little power, to stifle public protest whilst securing green votes. The incorruptible Spencer Quist and his allies soon gave the agency power and influence.

Quist had worked on the development of the atomic bomb and seen his wife die of radiation poisoning; Ridge was the secret agent type and Wren a conscientious researcher. Together they took science into people's living rooms, explaining about embryo research, subliminal messages, wonder drugs, dumping of toxic waste, noise pollution, nuclear weaponry and animal exploitation. Stories included a genetic mutation that created a particularly large and vicious race of rats, and a virus that ate away at all types of plastics, causing aeroplanes to fall out of the sky. There were also less dramatic stories such as an episode on the medical dangers of jet lag. After Davis and Pedler left the series at the conclusion of the second series in 1971, the series turned into a more conventional thriller drama. The two creators openly criticised this change.

The first two series consisted of thirteen episodes each and the third of twelve but "Sex and Violence", was not transmitted. It has been suggested that this was because of objections to either its use of stock news footage of a public execution in Lagos, or its presentation of characters designed to be satirical analogues of Mary Whitehouse, Cliff Richard and Lord Longford. The execution footage has appeared on British television a number of times since 1972, notably in a 1988 edition of Panorama about violence on television.

Doomwatch was popular, and at its peak drew audiences of as high as 13.6 million for the episode "Invasion", filmed mostly in the village of Grassington in North Yorkshire. The start of every series merited a cover feature on the BBC's Radio Times listings magazine, which even today is a prestigious feat for a programme. The series was also sold abroad, gaining some popularity when transmitted in Canada.

== Archive loss after production ==
As was common, the BBC wiped the Doomwatch master tapes soon after transmission, regarding them as being of little further use. Although some episodes have been returned from Canada or exist as telerecordings, many are still missing and will probably remain so, although all are being sought by the BBC Archive Treasure Hunt. A copy of the un-broadcast episode survives in the archives, one of only three from the final series. Series two is complete, thanks to the returns from Canada but series one is missing five episodes.

== Cast and crew ==
The main character throughout the series was Nobel Prize winner, Dr Spencer Quist, who had been given the task of setting up and running the department by the British government. Quist is haunted by guilt through having worked on the Manhattan Project, making the first nuclear bomb. He was played throughout the BBC run by John Paul, a familiar face from a range of British television series, who later went on to appear in I, Claudius.

The other regular character throughout the run was Dr John Ridge, played by Simon Oates. He often did not see eye to eye with Quist, whom he called a "bastard" in episode 7 for manipulating one of his staff into lying to Ridge on the telephone that their secretary, Pat Hunnisett, had died. Dr Ridge appeared in only four episodes of the final season. One of the first series' main characters was Tobias 'Toby' Wren (Robert Powell), who provided one of Doomwatch's most memorable episodes when he was dramatically killed off in an explosion at the conclusion of the series one finale, "Survival Code". Powell had only signed for one series; the producers wanted him to sign for a second run, but he was adamant that he wanted to leave the series on a high, and suggested that they get rid of him by blowing him up, which they did. The BBC got more letters on his unexpected death in the series than any other subject since the Second World War.

Wren was trying to disarm a nuclear device, which had been traced to a pavilion at the end of a seaside pier at Byfield Regis. Having thought he was finished, a pair of wire cutters slips from Wren's hands and falls into the sea just before he discovers a last wire as the remaining seconds tick away. Though the nuclear part of the bomb is safe, we see the pavilion explode as the conventional explosive goes off, killing Wren and two others. Though this episode is missing, the scene is shown at the start of the first episode of series two in which there are recriminations, guilt and an official enquiry, which is intended to get rid of Quist.

Wren was played by Robert Powell, who later found fame as the title character in the television series Jesus of Nazareth, and starred in films such as the 1978 version of The Thirty-Nine Steps and later the BBC medical series Holby City in the 2000s and 2010s. The ministerial antagonist to the Doomwatch team, determined to keep the department following the government line, was played by John Barron, better known as 'CJ' from the comedy series The Fall and Rise of Reginald Perrin. Other members of the cast were: Philip Bond as Inspector Drew, Joby Blanshard as Colin Bradley, Wendy Hall as Pat Hunnisett, Vivien Sherrard as Barbara Mason, John Nolan as Geoff Hardcastle, John Bown as Commander Neil Stafford, Jean Trend as Dr Fay Chantry, Elizabeth Weaver as Dr Anne Tarrant, and Moultrie Kelsall as Drummond.

Throughout its run, Doomwatch was produced by Terence Dudley, who also contributed several scripts himself. Dudley went on to produce another well-remembered BBC science-fiction drama, Survivors, and in the early 1980s wrote and directed episodes of Doctor Who. Several other writers wrote episodes for the programme, including well-known veterans of several other British television science-fiction productions such as Robert Holmes, Dennis Spooner and Louis Marks.

== Spin-off film ==
The Doomwatch feature film was produced by Tigon British Film Productions Ltd under licence from the BBC, and released in 1972. The script was based on a screenplay by Clive Exton from a story by Davis and Pedler. The television series' main characters appeared, played by their original actors, but main billing was given to Ian Bannen and Judy Geeson as new characters. The film also featured George Sanders.

== Revival ==
In 1999, Channel 5 bought the rights to revive Doomwatch from the BBC, and on 7 December that year screened a 100-minute TV movie produced by the independent production company Working Title Television. Subtitled Winter Angel, the television movie was a continuation of the story rather than a remake.

Written by John Howlett and Ian McDonald, only one of the original characters from the series appears, an aged Dr Spencer Quist—now played by actor Philip Stone, as John Paul had died in 1995. Quist is killed off during the course of the movie and the main character was Neil Tannahill, played by Trevor Eve, who at the conclusion of the story sets up a new Doomwatch group to pursue the same aims as that of the original series. In the film, an artificial black hole is created as an energy source. Once created, the black hole must be forever looked after or it could explode with force enough to destroy a country. Although Channel 5 had intended the production to act as the pilot for a possible series and it had been generally well received by critics and public, further episodes were not forthcoming. This was generally accepted to be for reasons of cost.

== Critical Reception ==
The science fiction historian John Clute gave the following assessment of Doomwatch :"Hugely influential (and popular) in its time, the series now seems simpleminded".

== VHS and DVD releases ==
BBC Enterprises released two VHS tapes in March 1991, the first containing "The Plastic Eaters" and "Tomorrow, the Rat", and the second "The Red Sky" and "You Killed Toby Wren". Paradox Films reissued the tape of "The Plastic Eaters"/"Tomorrow, the Rat" in June 1995, with a different cover, and subsequently released the same episodes on DVD in January 2001. In April 2016, Simply Media released a seven-disc DVD box set containing all 24 surviving episodes of Doomwatch, including "Sex and Violence", which remains unbroadcast. The DVD box set also contains the BBC documentary The Cult of Doomwatch, originally broadcast on BBC Four on 21 November 2006.

== Books ==
Pedler and Davis reused the plot of the first episode of the series, "The Plastic Eaters", for their 1971 novel Mutant 59: The Plastic Eater, This was not technically a Doomwatch novel, however, and did not contain the characters from the series. The book also re-used the Radio Times cover photograph of a melted plastic aeroplane in a briefcase.

In 1975, Longman Education published Doomwatch - The World in Danger, a simplified adaptation of the episodes "The Plastic Eaters", "The Red Sky" and "Survival Code". In 2012, Miwk Publishing released Deadly Dangerous Tomorrow, a collection of scripts of six of the missing episodes: "Spectre at the Feast", "Fire and Brimstone", "High Mountain", "Say Knife, Fat Man", "Deadly Dangerous Tomorrow" and "Flood".

== Episodes ==
Thirty-eight episodes of Doomwatch were recorded, 37 of which were broadcast on BBC1 on Monday nights from February 1970 to August 1972. Fourteen episodes are missing from the television archives, mainly from series three; 23 of the transmitted episodes of Doomwatch are known to survive; the untransmitted "Sex and Violence" also survives and has still never been broadcast on British television, although it is included on the 2016 DVD box set release. Episodes have been shown in 2024, 2025 and 2026 on Talking Pictures TV.

=== Series One ===
#	Episode	Writer(s)	Director	Original airdate	Archive status
1	The Plastic Eaters	Kit Pedler and Gerry Davis	Paul Ciapessoni	9 February 1970	Exists
While on a flight to San Pedro in South America, a passenger airliner crashes after all the plastic on board inexplicably melts. Later, scientist Tobias 'Toby' Wren applies for a job at Doomwatch, the governmental watchdog group run by Doctor Spencer Quist; he is immediately given the job, and promptly sent off to investigate the crash. Meanwhile, Quist's colleague Doctor John Ridge investigates at a laboratory in Beeston, and uncovers events surrounding a new experimental chemical. However, Toby soon finds himself on board another airliner, which has somehow become infected with the same plastic-eating virus—it seems his time at Doomwatch may be briefer than he first expected. Cast: John Paul as Dr Spencer Quist, Simon Oates as Dr John Ridge, Robert Powell as Tobias Wren, Joby Blanshard as Colin Bradley, Wendy Hall as Pat Hunnisett, Gracie Luck as First Stewardess, Tony Sibbald as First Captain, Richardson Morgan as First Engineer, Monty Brown as First Co-Pilot, John Barron as The Minister, Christopher Hodge as Commissionaire, Jennifer Wilson as Miss Wills, Michael Hawkins as Jim Bennett, Kevin Stoney as Hal Symmonds, Pat Wallen as Second Stewardess, Caroline Rogers as Third Stewardess, John Lee as Second Captain, Eric Corrie as Second Co-Pilot, Edward Dentith as Second Engineer, Andreas Malandrinos, Mike Lewin, Pat Beckett, Toba Laurence, Cynthia Bizeray, Peter Thompson, Michael Earl and Tony Haydon as Passengers.
2	Friday's Child	Harry Green	Paul Ciapessoni	16 February 1970	Missing
Quist and Doomwatch become embroiled in an enquiry into the heart-transplanting practices of Doctor Patrick. Several uncomfortable questions are raised: what has he been doing to a newborn baby that has been placed in his care, and should genetic engineering be permitted in society? Cast: John Paul as Dr Spencer Quist, Simon Oates as Dr John Ridge, Robert Powell as Tobias Wren, Alex Scott as Doctor Patrick, Mary Holland as Mrs. Patrick, Delia Paton as Mrs. Norman, John Tucker as Shopkeeper, Susan Lawrence as Passer-by, Bill Straiton as Det-Sgt., John Graham as Prosecuting Solicitor, Margaret John as Defending Solicitor, Richard Caldicot as Gwilliam.
3	Burial at Sea	Dennis Spooner	Jonathan Alwyn	23 February 1970	Missing
When a lifeboat crew discovers a luxury cruiser adrift in the English Channel, they find on board a group of wealthy pop stars and their girlfriends—one of whom is dead. Doomwatch investigates, and discovers that the death was not from drug abuse as was previously suspected; instead they begin to uncover the facts behind the dumping of a deadly chemical warfare compound in a deep sea trench, which seems to be far from dormant. Cast: John Paul as Dr Spencer Quist, Simon Oates as Dr John Ridge, Robert Powell as Tobias Wren, Joby Blanshard as Colin Bradley, Wendy Hall as Pat Hunnisett, Steve Emerson as Lifeboatman, Nova Saint-Claire as Angela Connor, Julian Barnes as Cobie Vale, Brian Spink as Peter Hazlewood, Peter Copley as Tranton, Gerald Sim as Doctor Collinson, John Stone as Johnny Clive, Alec Ross as Superintendent, Venetia Maxwell as Nurse, John Horsley as Astley, John Savident as The Minister.
4	Tomorrow, the Rat	Terence Dudley		2 March 1970	Exists
Doomwatch are alerted to reports of a number of attacks on humans by rats. Toby and Bradley investigate the house of Mr and Mrs Chambers, victims of a recent attack; the two scientists lay traps in the kitchen, but the rodents display unusual intelligence by jamming the traps open using cutlery found on a worktop, and then viciously attack the men. Meanwhile, Ridge becomes involved with Doctor Mary Bryant, who has been conducting experiments on a group of rats in a room in her flat - but the rats have managed to escape, and have now turned carnivorous. Cast: John Paul as Dr Spencer Quist, Simon Oates as Dr John Ridge, Robert Powell as Tobias Wren, Joby Blanshard as Colin Bradley, Wendy Hall as Pat Hunnisett, Penelope Lee as Dr Mary Bryant, Hamilton Dyce as Minister, Stephen Dudley as Small Boy, Eileen Helsby as Joyce Chambers, Robert Sansom as Dr Hugh Preston, Ray Roberts as Fred Chambers, Ian Elliott as Ambulance Driver, Marcelle Samett as Nurse, John Berryman as Reporter.
5	Project Sahara	Gerry Davis	Jonathan Alwyn	9 March 1970	Exists
Doomwatch is joined by Doctor Robson, sent to undertake tests on the new 'Sahara' spray which is apparently capable of destroying all plant life on the planet. But when Quist receives a phone call from the ministry, he is given orders to immediately suspend both Robson and Toby without any explanation. Closer investigation leads Quist and his team to discover that a new computerised security system run by Commander Keeping and Barker has become far too powerful, and is making its own decisions about government personnel. Cast: John Paul as Dr Spencer Quist, Simon Oates as Dr John Ridge, Robert Powell as Tobias Wren, Joby Blanshard as Colin Bradley, Wendy Hall as Pat Hunnisett, Nigel Stock as Commander Keeping, Hildegard Neil as Dr Stella Robson, Robert James as Barker, Margaret Pilleau as Computer Technician, Peter Hawkins as Computer Voice, Philip Brack as Jack Foster, Erik Chitty as Old Man, John Linares as Young Man.
6	Re-Entry Forbidden	Don Shaw	Paul Ciapessoni	16 March 1970	Exists
The first nuclear-powered rocket, Sunfire One, is sent into space with the first British astronaut, Dick Larch, on board. After the rocket enters Earth orbit, Larch enters an incorrect course alteration, and fails to see the error indicator, which results in Sunfire One splashing down in the sea. Quist is asked by Doctor Goldsworthy to determine whether Larch is suitable for any further missions, as another such mistake could result in the spacecraft becoming a nuclear bomb. Cast: John Paul as Dr Spencer Quist, Simon Oates as Dr John Ridge, Robert Powell as Tobias Wren, Joby Blanshard as Colin Bradley, Wendy Hall as Pat Hunnisett, Joseph Fürst as Charles Goldsworthy, Veronica Strong as Carol Larch, Dougal Fraser as TV Commentator, Craig Hunter as Bill Edwards, Noel Sheldon as Max Friedman, Michael McGovern as Dick Larch, James Burke as BBC Man London, Michael Aspel as BBC Man Houston, Kevin Scott as Gus Clarke, Grant Taylor as Colonel Kramer, John Kidd as Johnson, John Boxer as Brown.
7	The Devil's Sweets	Don Shaw	David Proudfoot	23 March 1970	Exists
While on the way to work, secretary Pat Hunnisett takes a free promotional chocolate from a group of girls on the street. Meanwhile, at the Doomwatch office, Quist and his team are investigating the sudden increase in the country's smokers, and are surprised when Pat arrives and lights up a cigarette for the first time in five years. Quist suspects that there could be a link between the promotional chocolates and 'Checker Board' cigarettes, whose recent sales are doing unexpectedly well. Should subliminal advertising be allowed? Cast: John Paul as Dr Spencer Quist, Simon Oates as Dr John Ridge, Robert Powell as Tobias Wren, Joby Blanshard as Colin Bradley, Wendy Hall as Pat Hunnisett, Maurice Roëves as Shipton, Penny Dixon as Miss Cooper, William Fox as Scott, Bay White as Mrs. Tyler, John Comer as Jack, John Law as Pegg, Pamela Sholto as Miss James, John Young as Benson, Mary Loughran as Dr Gray, Patrick Connel as Dr Green.
8	The Red Sky	Kit Pedler and Gerry Davis	Jonathan Alwyn	6 April 1970	Exists
Quist takes a holiday, and stays at the Kent home of his friend Bernard Colley and his daughter Dana. He learns of the death of Captain Gort, who inexplicably threw himself off the nearby cliffs after writing the phrase 'the flames of hell' on the walls of his lighthouse home. Colley visits the lighthouse, and he too sees a vision of the sky turned a fiery red. Quist suspects that these strange events are caused by the testing of a prototype jet plane, and that the noise of the engine is being amplified by the structure of the lighthouse, causing sensory damage to anyone caught within its effects. Cast: John Paul as Dr Spencer Quist, Simon Oates as Dr John Ridge, Robert Powell as Tobias Wren, Joby Blanshard as Colin Bradley, Wendy Hall as Pat Hunnisett, Paul Eddington as Reynolds, Aubrey Richards as Bernard Colley, Edward Kelsey as Captain Gort, Jennifer Daniel as Dana Colley, Dudley Jones as Dr O'Brien, Sheila Raynor as Mrs. Knott, Michael Elwyn as Duncan.
9	Spectre at the Feast	Terence Dudley	Eric Hills	13 April 1970	Missing
In order to decide on new proposals for dealing with the dangers of pollution on the environment, Quist assembles a conference amongst the world's top scientists. Several of the delegates soon become ill, apparently from food poisoning. However, Quist becomes suspicious, and suspects that the sickness may have been caused deliberately. Cast: John Paul as Dr Spencer Quist, Simon Oates as Dr John Ridge, Robert Powell as Tobias Wren, Joby Blanshard as Colin Bradley, Wendy Hall as Pat Hunnisett, William Lucas as Fielding, Richard Hurndall as Whitehead, Bruno Barnabe as Head Waiter, Oscar Quitak as Bau, George Pravda as Egri, David Morrell as Royston, Karen Ford as Mrs. Bonenti, Helen Dowling as Laura Lindsay, Roy Stewart as Negro.
10	Train and De-Train	Don Shaw	Vere Lorrimer	20 April 1970	Exists
When the Doomwatch team investigates the mass-destruction of wildlife in Somerset, Toby is dismayed to learn that the person seemingly responsible is his old tutor, Ellis. But closer examination uncovers the fact that Ellis is being slowly forced out of his job by American 'de-training' methods, and soon the finger of suspicion is pointed squarely at the company he works for, and his boss, Mitchell. Cast: John Paul as Dr Spencer Quist, Simon Oates as Dr John Ridge, Robert Powell as Tobias Wren, Joby Blanshard as Colin Bradley, Wendy Hall as Pat Hunnisett, George Baker as Mitchell, David Markham as Ellis, Mark Sinclair as Boy, Peter Whitaker as Ministry Inspector, Ron Gregory as Guard, Bill Wilde as Branston, Patricia Maynard as Miss Sephton, Rosemary Turner as Miss Jones, Brian Badcoe as Stephens
11	The Battery People	Elwyn Jones	David Proudfoot	27 April 1970	Exists
Doomwatch hears that in south Wales, tough ex-miners have taken to drinking gin instead of their usual beer, and are unresponsive to their wives' sexual advances, instead preferring to attend secret cockfighting tournaments. After Quist is asked by the minister to look into the situation, as it is happening within his constituency, he and his team trace the cause to the local fish farm, which is using a special chemical to dissolve the bones in the fish. Unfortunately, this has led to the workforce becoming sterile. Cast: John Paul as Dr Spencer Quist, Simon Oates as Dr John Ridge, Robert Powell as Tobias Wren, Joby Blanshard as Colin Bradley, Emrys Jones as Colonel Smithson, Jeremy Young as Vincent Llewellyn, Ray Mort as Jones, Edward Evans as Dai, Michael Newport as Bryn, David Davies as Davies, Eliza Ward as Elizabeth Llewellyn, Mary Hignett as Mrs. Adams, Jay Neill as Laing.
12	Hear No Evil	Gerry Davis	Frank Cox	4 May 1970	Missing
In an effort to prevent unofficial strikes by its workforce, a company in the North of England decides to use the latest scientific discovery, and attempts to manipulate both the working and the private lives of its employees by bugging them with listening devices. However, when Quist hears of this underhanded practice, he is furious, and decides that the only way to stop the unethical management is to turn their own method against them. Cast: John Paul as Dr Spencer Quist, Simon Oates as Dr John Ridge, Robert Powell as Tobias Wren, Joby Blanshard as Colin Bradley, Wendy Hall as Pat Hunnisett, Griffith Jones as Falkner, Michael Ripper as Reid, Brian Cox as Owen, Derrick O'Connor as Operator, Peter Miles as Cook, Tessa Shaw as Mrs. Reid, Sheila Sands as Stripper.
13	Survival Code	Kit Pedler and Gerry Davis	Hugh David	11 May 1970	Missing
A military plane ditches into the sea whilst carrying three nuclear weapons on board. While the RAF mounts a search mission, an unidentified object is washed up on the shore near Byfield pier on the south coast of England. It is found by two men, Geoff Harker and Sam Billings, who decide that it must be a weather-detecting device, and so begin to strip it down for parts. Toby is sent to investigate the device, but he soon finds himself faced with the terrifying prospect of disarming a very live bomb. Cast: John Paul as Dr Spencer Quist, Simon Oates as Dr John Ridge, Robert Powell as Tobias Wren, Joby Blanshard as Colin Bradley, Wendy Hall as Pat Hunnisett, Ray Brooks as Geoff Harker, Hamilton Dyce as Minister, Tommy Godfrey as Sam Billings, Donald Morley as Air Commodore Parks, Colin Rix as Wing Commander, Stephanie Turner as Toni Harker, Robert Cartland as Commander Sefton, Edwin Brown as Len White, John Dawson as Chief Supt. Charles, David St. John as First Man on Pier.

=== Series Two ===
#	Episode	Writer(s)	Director	Original airdate	Archive status
1	You Killed Toby Wren	Terence Dudley		14 December 1970	Exists
While attempting to defuse the bomb washed up at Byfield Regis pier, Toby Wren was killed. Quist finds himself wracked with guilt, and facing an investigating tribunal. Under pressure from the inquiry, and confronted by a furious Ridge - who holds Quist personally responsible for Toby's death - Quist turns to a psychiatrist for help. Geoff Hardcastle then arrives at the Doomwatch office, bringing with him disturbing news concerning horrific genetic experiments being conducted by Professor Hayland. Ridge decides to investigate, but becomes more involved than he was expecting to. Cast: John Paul as Dr Spencer Quist, Simon Oates as Dr John Ridge, John Nolan as Geoff Hardcastle, Joby Blanshard as Colin Bradley, Vivien Sherrard as Barbara Mason, John Barron as The Minister, Donald Morley as Air Commodore Parks, Edward Underdown as Chairman of Tribunal, McDonald Hobley as Permanent Secretary, Robert Powell as Tobias Wren, Edwin Brown as Len White, David St. John as First Man on Pier, Maggie Young as Barmaid, Elizabeth Weaver as Dr Anne Tarrant, Shirley Dixon as Dr Judith Lennox, Tommy Godfrey as Sam Billings, Robert Gillespie as Dr Warren, Graham Leaman as Professor Eric Hayland.
2	Invasion	Martin Worth	Jonathan Alwyn	21 December 1970	Exists
Whilst exploring in some caves, two boys go missing. Ridge and Hardcastle investigate, but when they visit a local building named Wensdale Grange, they are strongly warned off by an army unit, which has taken over the entire area, killing any intruding animals and showing hostility to any human intruders. Doomwatch soon discovers that during the Second World War, Wensdale Grange was used as a base for the development of bacterial warfare, and that the chemical weapons which were stored there have now somehow leaked into the local water supply. Cast: John Paul as Dr Spencer Quist, Simon Oates as Dr John Ridge, John Nolan as Geoff Hardcastle, Simon Cain as Soldier, Barrie Cookson as Wilson, Leslie Meadows as Reggie, David Lincoln as Dave, Victor Platt as Joe Bates, Arthur Brough as Sandy Larch, Anthony Sagar as Sergeant Harris, Peter Welch as Tom Hedley, Sheila Raynor as Mrs. Smith, Joyce Windsor as Mrs. Hunter, Kim Butcher as Child, Geoffrey Palmer as Major Sims, Bill Stratton as Sergeant, Michael Elwyn as Duncan, the BBC thanks the 7 Field Squadron, Royal Engineers for their co-operation.
3	The Islanders	Louis Marks	Jonathan Alwyn	4 January 1971	Exists
When the remote Pacific island of St. Simon begins to suffer from dangerous earth tremors, the British government evacuates the two hundred inhabitants and brings them to the safety of mainland Britain. Forced into the bustle of busy life on the mainland, the vast majority of the islanders soon find themselves unable to cope with the modern world, and become objects of curiosity and the butt of jokes. When one of them dies and others get ill, Quist has strong fears about their lack of resistance to common illness in mainland Britain. However, he later discovers that the food they ate on St. Simon causes early deaths, and the islanders are faced with a decision: should they try and stay in a world they don't understand, or should they face early death by returning to their island home? Cast: John Paul as Dr Spencer Quist, Simon Oates as Dr John Ridge, Joby Blanshard as Colin Bradley, David Buck as Isaac, George A. Cooper as Thomas, Charles Rea as Inspector, Shelagh Fraser as Joan, Geraldine Sherman as Alice, Geoffrey Chater as Mullery, Rachel Treadgold as Miss Marshall, George Waring as Busby, Robert Sansom as Doctor Somerville, Geoffrey Davion, Ian MacKenzie and Guy Graham as Islanders.
4	No Room for Error	Roger Parkes	Darrol Blake	11 January 1971	Exists
Dr Fay Chantry contacts the team at Doomwatch, asking for their urgent assistance. She is extremely concerned about the work that her company has been carrying out on a new 'wonder-drug' known as Stellamycin. Several children have died, and it appears that their deaths are attributable to the new drug - the country could be on the verge of an epidemic.. Cast: John Paul as Dr Spencer Quist, Simon Oates as Dr John Ridge, Jean Trend as Dr Fay Chantry, Joby Blanshard as Colin Bradley, Vivien Sherrard as Barbara Mason, John Wood as Nigel Waring, Anthony Ainley as Senior House Officer, Anthony Sharp as Dr Ian Phelps, Angus MacKay as Professor Lewin, Michael Culver as Minister's PPS, Freda Dowie as Hilda, Norman Scace as Elliott, Sheila Grant as Gillian Blake.
5	By the Pricking of My Thumbs...	Robin Chapman	Eric Hills	18 January 1971	Exists
Sixteen-year-old Stephen Franklin stages a prank while in a school science class, but the joke goes wrong, and a classmate suffers horrible facial injuries. When Stephen is then expelled from the comprehensive school, his father, journalist Oscar Franklin, enquires as to why, and how does a scientist named Ensor know of Stephen's genetic past? Stephen suffers from an abnormality of his hands, and he has an obscure genetic defect: an extra Y chromosome. Doomwatch becomes involved when it seems that there may be a genetic explanation for violent and unpredictable behaviour. Cast: John Paul as Dr Spencer Quist, Simon Oates as Dr John Ridge, John Nolan as Geoff Hardcastle, Jean Trend as Dr Fay Chantry, Vivien Sherrard as Barbara Mason, Bernard Hepton as Oscar Franklin, Patsy Byrne as Mary Franklin, Martin Howells as Jenkins, Barry Stokes as Stephen Franklin, David Janson as MacPherson, Robert Yetzes as Painton, Olaf Pooley as Ensor, Colin Jeavons as Botting, David Jarrett as Avery, Sally Thomsett as Judy Franklin, Julie May as Woman Shopper, Paula Smith as Ground Hostess, Patrick Milner as Airport Policeman.
6	The Iron Doctor	Brian Hayles	Joan Kemp-Welch	25 January 1971	Exists
The intensive care unit at Parkway hospital is using a computer to monitor the patients, but the computer inexplicably allows a patient to die. Quist is warned by the hospital's Doctor Carson that the computer is a model 20/90 that has been modified by Doctor Whittaker, and that it is able to think for itself, making decisions based upon its observations. The only problem is the computer is deliberately killing the patients that it decides are beyond reasonable help. Cast: John Paul as Dr Spencer Quist, Simon Oates as Dr John Ridge, John Nolan as Geoff Hardcastle, Jean Trend as Dr Fay Chantry, Joby Blanshard as Colin Bradley, Vivien Sherrard as Barbara Mason, James Maxwell as Dr Whittaker, Barry Foster as Dr Carson, Harold Bennett as George, Frederick Schiller as Mr. Faber, Gloria Connell as Duty Nurse, Keith Grenville as Dr Godfrey, Amanda Walker as Sister Trewin, Frank Littlewood as Mr. Kemp, Raymond Young as Mr. Tearson, Jeanie James as Second Nurse, Paul Nemeer as Doctor, Michael Ely, Clive Rogers and Joyce Freeman as Visitors.
7	Flight into Yesterday	Martin Worth	Darrol Blake	1 February 1971	Exists
Quist flies to Los Angeles in order to address an important ecological conference, but at the last minute, he is recalled by the Minister. After two long flights across time zones within a short period of time, he suffers from extreme jet-lag, but this is misinterpreted as drunkenness. Believing Quist to be unable to fulfil his obligations, the Minister orders him to be replaced by Ridge, and the Minister decides to accompany Ridge to the conference. But then the Minister too falls victim to the rigours of excessive jet-lag in a scheme by rival businesses. Cast: John Paul as Dr Spencer Quist, Simon Oates as Dr John Ridge, John Nolan as Geoff Hardcastle, Jean Trend as Dr Fay Chantry, Joby Blanshard as Colin Bradley, Vivien Sherrard as Barbara Mason, John Barron as The Minister, Robert Urquhart as Ainslie, Michael Elwyn as Duncan, John Quarmby as Secretary, Jennifer Wilson as Miss Wills, Desmond Llewellyn as Thompson, Mary Loughran and Penny Service as Air Hostesses, Bill Bailey and Steve Preston as Reporters.
8	The Web of Fear	Gerry Davis	Eric Hills	8 February 1971	Exists
What appears to be a yellow fever epidemic breaks out at an exclusive health clinic on one of the Isles of Scilly. After the island is sealed off from visitors and any possible mosquitoes exterminated, Doomwatch is granted permission to investigate, but Quist's team soon discovers that the illness is actually a mutated new virus. It seems that an experiment into vaccines has gone wildly out of control, and hundreds of spiders are now carrying a deadly new disease. Cast: John Paul as Dr Spencer Quist, Simon Oates as Dr John Ridge, John Nolan as Geoff Hardcastle, Jean Trend as Dr Fay Chantry, Joby Blanshard as Colin Bradley, Vivien Sherrard as Barbara Mason, John Savident as Minister, Michael Elwyn as Duncan, Desmond Cullum-Jones as Patterson, Walter Horsburgh as Dr Seaton, John Lee as Jenson, Glyn Owen as Griffiths, Stephanie Bidmead as Janine, Anthony Newlands as Dr George.
9	In the Dark	John Gould	Lennie Mayne	15 February 1971	Exists
An Irishman named O'Mullin dies from the effects of mustard gas after swimming off the south coast of Ireland. Ridge discovers that the mustard gas originates from February 1946, when a Royal Navy escort vessel sank under the command of Lyon McArthur, a former colleague of Quist at Oxford. Quist learns that McArthur is now increasingly being kept alive purely by machines, and soon he will lose all physical sensations, existing purely as a mind kept alive by mechanical means. Cast: John Paul as Dr Spencer Quist, Simon Oates as Dr John Ridge, John Nolan as Geoff Hardcastle, Jean Trend as Dr Fay Chantry, Joby Blanshard as Colin Bradley, Vivien Sherrard as Barbara Mason, Patrick Troughton as McArthur, Alethea Charlton as Flora Seton, Jane Dore as Receptionist, Simon Lack as Andrew Seton, David Purcell as Journalist, Michael Ellison as Naval Officer, Joseph Greig as Dr Jackson.
10	The Human Time Bomb	Louis Marks	Joan Kemp-Welch	22 February 1971	Exists
At a tower block constructed by the Ampleforth Development Corporation, Fay is working on an environmental report into the conditions there. Property millionaire Sir Billy Langly foresees that by the year 2000 there will be eighty million people living in the country, which will result in a demand for new kinds of housing. He believes that tower blocks are the way forward, but this 'battery' idea of living can result in a particularly depressing urban neurosis - something that Fay is forced to experience firsthand. Cast: John Paul as Dr Spencer Quist, Simon Oates as Dr John Ridge, Jean Trend as Dr Fay Chantry, Joan Phillips as Mrs. Hetherington, Talfryn Thomas as Mr. Hetherington, Laurence Bulaitis as Laurence, John Quayle as Cavendish, Ursula Hirst as Mrs. Frank, Philip Bond as Inspector Drew, Gloria Connell as Policewoman, Ray Armstrong as Donovan, Patrick Godfrey as Grant, Roddy McMillan as Scobie, Kevin Brennan as Sir Billy Langly, Doreen Andrew as Mrs. Scobie, Tom Collister as Man in Lift.
11	The Inquest	Robert Holmes	Lennie Mayne	1 March 1971	Exists
In the town of Sileby, a schoolgirl named Marion Duffy dies of rabies, but no-one is able to identify the source. The inquest into her death is highly controversial, but even more shocking is Colin Bradley's recommendation that every dog within a five-mile radius be destroyed. Cast: John Paul as Dr Spencer Quist, John Nolan as Geoff Hardcastle, Joby Blanshard as Colin Bradley, Frederick Treves as Dr Fane, Laurie Webb as Dog Owner, David Spurling as Philips, Judith Furse as Mary Lincoln, Frederick Hall as Pritchard, Jean Marlow as Marge, Robert Cawdron as McAlister, Garry Smith as Harry, Edward Evans as Coroner, George Giles as Policeman.
12	The Logicians	Dennis Spooner	David Proudfoot	15 March 1971	Exists
Thieves break into Beresford Pharmaceuticals in Hampshire and steal vital papers. The company's managing director, Jack Priestland is understandably concerned, particularly when the police are unable to find any clues as to how the culprits were able to penetrate the sophisticated electronic security system at the plant. But no-one has considered that Priestland's son Malcolm, a mathematical genius who has been taught by computers, may be the true perpetrator. Cast: John Paul as Dr Spencer Quist, Simon Oates as Dr John Ridge, John Nolan as Geoff Hardcastle, Jean Trend as Dr Fay Chantry, Joby Blanshard as Colin Bradley, Robin Davies as Malcolm Priestland, Stuart Knee as David Wagstaffe, Peter Duncan as Colin Tredget, Robert Barry Jr. as Richard Whetlor, John Kelland as Withers, Stanley Lebor as Handyman, Noel Johnson as Jack Priestland, Michael Gover as Kelsey, George Selway as C.I.D. Sergeant, Irene Prador as Mrs. Grantz.
13	Public Enemy	Patrick Alexander	Lennie Mayne	22 March 1971	Exists
When a boy named Jimmy tries to retrieve his football from the roof of the Carlingham Alloys factory, he collapses and later dies in hospital. An inquest reveals that his lungs burnt out as a result of beryllium poisoning. The highly unusual circumstances of Jimmy's death leads to Doomwatch investigating the factory, where a new alloy process is being developed. Then one of the workers named Nicholls dies from a high fall after also getting beryllium poisoning. Quist then starts making health and safety recommendations for the factory costing many thousands of pounds, causing the International company to shut their Carlingham factory down and move production to their Leicester factory, much to the locals' disagreement and anger. Both management and the workforce become increasingly angry about the Doomwatch investigation, which they see as a threat to their profits, ambitions, expansion plans and jobs. Cast: John Paul as Dr Spencer Quist, Simon Oates as Dr John Ridge, John Nolan as Geoff Hardcastle, Jean Trend as Dr Fay Chantry, Joby Blanshard as Colin Bradley, Vivien Sherrard as Barbara Mason, Glyn Houston as Gerald Marlowe, Trevor Bannister as Lewis, Derek Benfield as Arnold Payne, John Trayhorn as Jimmy Brookes, Terry Bale as Walsh, Roy Purcell as Doctor Barton, Rhoda Lewis as Mrs. Freeman, Barbara Bolton as Mrs. Jones, Bill Weston as Nicholls, Norman Florence as Donovan, Frances Pidgeon as Secretary, Michael Elwyn as Duncan.

=== Series Three ===
#	Episode	Writer(s)	Director	Original airdate	Archive status
1	Fire and Brimstone	Terence Dudley		5 June 1972	Missing
John Ridge apparently suffers a breakdown from the pressure, and decides that, due to the excessive threat of pollution on the environment, drastic steps should be taken. He steals some phials of the deadly bacteria anthrax, and holds the government to ransom: unless his anti-pollution terms are met, he will destroy humanity by releasing the virus in a number of major cities. A race against time begins - can Ridge be tracked down before it is too late? Cast: John Paul as Dr Spencer Quist, Simon Oates as Dr John Ridge, John Barron as The Minister, Elizabeth Weaver as Dr Anne Tarrant, John Bown as Commander Neil Stafford, Joby Blanshard as Colin Bradley, Vivien Sherrard as Barbara Mason, Henry Knowles as Dr Richard Poole, Caroline Rogers as Julie, Michael Elwyn as Duncan, John Rake as Police Sergeant, Marcelle Samett and Julia Hand as Bystanders, John Berryman as Reporter, Eric Longworth as Prison Officer Clarke, Talfryn Thomas as Warren, Clifford Cox as Radio Operator, Jonathan Pryce and David Waterman as Police Constables, Frank Singuineau as Chemist.
2	High Mountain	Martin Worth	Lennie Mayne	12 June 1972	Missing
An inquiry into Doomwatch is begun following the events surrounding Ridge's breakdown. Meanwhile, Quist is summoned to a large country estate in Scotland, where he finds himself offered a new position with both power and wealth in the private sector, but only if he will curtail his investigations into a new drug called disocyanate. Back in London, the Minister decides that it is time to place his own man within Doomwatch, and so dispatches Commander Neil Stafford to join the team. Cast: John Paul as Dr Spencer Quist, John Barron as The Minister, Elizabeth Weaver as Dr Anne Tarrant, John Bown as Commander Neil Stafford, Joby Blanshard as Colin Bradley, Vivien Sherrard as Barbara Mason, Ronald Hines as Ian Drummond, John Scott as Cowley, Kedd Senton as Barman, Ian Elliott as Manservant, Moultrie Kelsall as Alexander Drummond, Betty Cadno as Mrs. Bell, David Grahame as Gillie.
3	Say Knife, Fat Man	Martin Worth	Eric Hills	19 June 1972	Missing
Many years ago, Quist worked on the Manhattan Project, which was instrumental in the designing of the atomic bomb codenamed 'Fat Man', used to obliterate the port of Nagasaki during the Second World War. This involvement has continued to weigh heavily on Quist's conscience ever since. Hearing the phrase "Say knife", he recognises a potential threat—one that is tied into a break-in at a plutonium base. A group of young student activists have stolen several radioactive fuel rods, and are planning to construct their very own atomic device. Cast: John Paul as Dr Spencer Quist, John Barron as The Minister, John Bown as Commander Neil Stafford, Joby Blanshard as Colin Bradley, Vivien Sherrard as Barbara Mason, Alan Hockey as Lawson, Peter King as Eddie, Anthony Andrews as Carlos, Adrian Wright as David, Elisabeth Sladen as Sarah Collins, Hugh Ross as Ian, Maria O'Brien as Susan Proud, Paul Seed as Michael, Peter Halliday as Rafael, Geoffrey Palmer as Chief Supt. Mallory, Hugh Cross as Professor Holman, Sean Lynch as Williams, Leslie Schofield as Harry.
4	Waiting for a Knighthood	Terence Dudley	Pennant Roberts	26 June 1972	Exists
Ridge begins to recover from his breakdown, but it is felt that he should not return to duty at Doomwatch. When tins of paint are found stored in his garage, Bradley suspects that toxic fumes from the lead in the paint may have affected Ridge's mind, and therefore been responsible for his erratic behaviour. A debate into the effects of dangerous chemical processes begins, and oil baron Richard Massingham finds himself personally involved when his son Stephen is kidnapped by someone displaying similar symptoms of poisoning. Cast: John Paul as Dr Spencer Quist, Simon Oates as Dr John Ridge, John Barron as The Minister, Elizabeth Weaver as Dr Anne Tarrant, John Bown as Commander Neil Stafford, Joby Blanshard as Colin Bradley, Vivien Sherrard as Barbara Mason, Frederick Jaeger as Richard Massingham, Ann Firbank as Peggy Massingham, Anthony Oliver as The Rev. Frank Simpson, Margaret John as Mrs. Simpson, Stephen Dudley as Stephen Massingham, Julie Neubert as Josie, Gwen Watford as Joan Sylvester, Don McKillop as Det.-Chief Insp. Logan, Noelle Middleton as Mrs. Duncan-Foster, Bruce Purchase as Norman Sylvester, Anthony Edwards as Mike.
5	Without the Bomb	Roger Parkes	Darrol Blake	3 July 1972	Missing
A revolutionary new lipstick goes on sale, containing pheromones designed to act as an aphrodisiac in order to make the wearer more attractive and desirable to men. This prompts Quist and Bradley to begin an investigation into the effects that pheromones have on people, and how they can alter the illusion of free will. Cast: John Paul as Dr Spencer Quist, John Barron as The Minister, Elizabeth Weaver as Dr Anne Tarrant, John Bown as Commander Neil Stafford, Joby Blanshard as Colin Bradley, Vivien Sherrard as Barbara Mason, Brian Peck as Dr James Fulton, Antonia Pemberton as Mrs. Joan Fulton, Charles Hodgson as Harry Brooke, Kenneth Benda as Clive Hughes, Katherine Kath as Lady Holroyd, Penny Dixon and Trevor T. Smith as Young Couple, Kenneth Gardiner as Reporter, Michael Montgomery as TV Reporter, Marcelle Samett as Female Reporter, Sally Anne Marlowe as Amanda Fulton, John Gregg as Roger Halls.
6	Hair Trigger	Brian Hayles	Quentin Lawrence	10 July 1972	Exists
Doomwatch's attention falls on the Weatheroak Hall Medical Research Unit, where mentally ill patients are being given computer treatments as a way of improving their conditions. When Anne Tarrant investigates, she discovers that there are side effects to the process, and that an apparently well-balanced patient can respond violently to a single phrase, and soon a manhunt for a 'rehabilitated' multiple murderer begins. Cast: John Paul as Dr Spencer Quist, John Barron as The Minister, Elizabeth Weaver as Dr Anne Tarrant, John Bown as Commander Neil Stafford, Vivien Sherrard as Barbara Mason, Michael Hawkins as Beavis, Barry Jackson as Dr McEwan, Morris Perry as Professor Hetherington, Pamela Saire as Miss Abrahams, Damon Sanders as Robbie, Gillian Lewis as Emily, Victor Platt as Police Inspector, Dan Caulfield as Policeman.
7	Deadly Dangerous Tomorrow	Martin Worth	Darrol Blake	17 July 1972	Missing
Ridge continues his ecological crusade by warning against the dangerous side-effects upon the world's developing countries of the chemical insecticide known as DDT. He stages a publicity stunt by flying in an Indian family and setting them up in a tent in the middle of London's St. James's Park. However, the prank backfires when it is discovered that one of them is suffering from malaria. Cast: John Paul as Dr Spencer Quist, Simon Oates as Dr John Ridge, John Barron as The Minister, Elizabeth Weaver as Dr Anne Tarrant, John Bown as Commander Neil Stafford, Joby Blanshard as Colin Bradley, Vivien Sherrard as Barbara Mason, Michael Elwyn as Duncan, Ahmad Nagi, Farhat Shamsi, Talib Shamsi and Rahat Shamsi as Indian Family, Madhav Sharma as Hanif Kahn, Cec Linder as Senator Connell, Lorna Lewis as Miss Brandon, Maria O'Brien as Susan Proud, Marc Zuber, Bill Ward and John Wyman as Reporters, Renu Setna as His Excellency.
8	Enquiry	John Gould	Pennant Roberts	24 July 1972	Missing
Doomwatch is alerted to a laboratory where a new toxic gas is being developed for military use, available in a 'handy' aerosol can for easy application during conflict. But Quist and Anne's enquiry soon leads them to doubt that the scientists' safety measures concerning the storage of the gas may not be as secure as they think. Cast: John Paul as Dr Spencer Quist, John Barron as The Minister, Elizabeth Weaver as Dr Anne Tarrant, John Bown as Commander Neil Stafford, Joby Blanshard as Colin Bradley, Vivien Sherrard as Barbara Mason, Jack Tweddle as Mike Clarke, Malcolm Johns as Tractor Driver, Michael Forrest as Dr Evans, Margaret Ashcroft as Dr Margery Becker, Eddie Doyle as Dr O'Dell, Barrie Cookson as Colonel Jones, Ann Curthoys as Susan Lewis, Michael Keating as Stephen Grigg, James Ottaway as Mr. Clark.
9	Flood	Ian Curteis	Quentin Lawrence	31 July 1972	Missing
Quist is concerned by the fact that, approximately every one hundred years, certain extreme weather conditions arise which lead to an increase in the water level of the River Thames—and just one inch higher would result in the whole of London flooding. Even more disturbing is the fact that this increase is imminent. Cast: John Paul as Dr Spencer Quist, John Barron as The Minister, John Bown as Commander Neil Stafford, Joby Blanshard as Colin Bradley, Vivien Sherrard as Barbara Mason, Tim Nicholls as BBC Reporter, Raymond Mason as Critchley, David Landon as Assistant, Wensley Pithey as Ericson, Derek Benfield as Dr Ridley, Robert Raglan as General, Robert James as G.L.C. Man, Michael Lees as Ministry of Defence Man, Patrick Jordan as Lt.-Cmdr. Morrison.
10	Cause of Death	Louis Marks	Lennie Mayne	7 August 1972	Missing
When John Ridge's father, Wilfred, becomes seriously ill, he decides to devote all his time to looking after him. Wilfred is then taken to hospital and put into the care of Doctor Cordell, but shortly afterward he dies. Ridge is suspicious, and his investigations uncover a disturbing fact: Doctor Cordell is an advocate of euthanasia. Cast: John Paul as Dr Spencer Quist, Simon Oates as Dr John Ridge, John Barron as The Minister, Elizabeth Weaver as Dr Anne Tarrant, John Bown as Commander Neil Stafford, Vivien Sherrard as Barbara Mason, Margaret Ford as First Sister, John Lee as Doctor Cordell, Maria O'Brien as Susan Proud, Jennifer Wilson as Edna, Nicholas Courtney as Phillip, Graham Leaman as Wilfred Ridge, Patsy Trench as Second Sister, Anne Lee as Laboratory Assistant.
11	Killer Dolphins	Roy Russell	Darrol Blake	14 August 1972	Missing
Dolphins have long been established as highly intelligent creatures, and the United States Navy has now begun using them in their new program. They are training the dolphins to act as underwater saboteurs, able to attach magnetic explosive devices to the undersides of enemy ships. Quist investigates the matter, and discovers that these apparently docile creatures are capable of becoming deadly killers - something that he experiences firsthand. Cast: John Paul as Dr Spencer Quist, John Barron as The Minister, John Bown as Commander Neil Stafford, Joby Blanshard as Colin Bradley, Vivien Sherrard as Barbara Mason, Angelo Infanti as Professor Fillippo Balbo, Maria O'Brien as Susan Proud, Rita Giovannini as Guila, Viviane Ventura as Paola Maria Totti, Richardson Morgan as Bill Manzaro, Frank Duncan as Commodore Aylward, Bruno Barnabe as Cavalli.
12	Sex and Violence	Stuart Douglass	Darrol Blake	Untransmitted	Exists
Conservative housewives across the country are united in calling for a return to 'decency', rallying against the sex and violence inherent in society's media. When a commission headed by Lord Purvis is set up to decide if the current laws concerning these matters need tightening up, the minister appoints Anne as one of the members of the enquiry. However, when she attends a performance of the controversial new play 'Do It' as part of her research, Anne is attacked by an angry mob. Just what motivates the people who are so consumed by hostile attitudes towards sex and violence in society's culture, and why is multimillionaire Arthur Ballantyne funding them? Cast: John Paul as Dr Spencer Quist, John Barron as The Minister, Elizabeth Weaver as Dr Anne Tarrant, John Bown as Commander Neil Stafford, Joby Blanshard as Colin Bradley, Vivien Sherrard as Barbara Mason, Nicholas Selby as Arthur Ballantyne, June Brown as Mrs. Catchpole, Donald Eccles as Lord Purvis, Bernard Horsfall as Steven Granger, Angela Crow as Mrs. Hastings, Noel Dyson as Mrs. Angela Cressy, Brian Wilde as Professor Fairbairn, Llewellyn Rees as The Rev. Garrison, Chris Chittell as Dick Burns, Queenie Watts as Demonstrator, Sebastian Graham Jones as Young Man, Richard Vanstone, John Hood and Paul Nemeer as Stewards.

== Sources ==
- Radio Times, 1970–1972.
