= Pennant Roberts =

British director and producer (1940–2010)

- Born: John Pennant Roberts; 15 December 1940; Weston-super-Mare, Somerset, England
- Died: 22 June 2010 (aged 69); Cardiff, Wales
- Education: University of Bristol
- Occupations: Television director and producer
- Years active: 1962–2010
- Spouse: Betsan Roberts

John Pennant Roberts (15 December 1940 – 22 June 2010) was a British director and producer known for his work in British television drama.

== Early life ==
Roberts was born at Weston-super-Mare in Somerset to Welsh parents. He went to school in Bristol and read physics at the University of Bristol.

== Career ==
Beginning his television career as a floor manager with BBC Wales, he later directed BBC television drama programmes including Softly, Softly, Doomwatch, The Onedin Line, Sutherland's Law, Survivors, Angels, Blake's 7, Doctor Who, Juliet Bravo, Tenko and Howards' Way.

Regarding Roberts' contribution to Doctor Who, for which he directed five televised serials between 1977 and 1985 (starring Tom Baker, Peter Davison and Colin Baker), as well as another, Shada, which wasn't originally completed, Patrick Mulkern of Radio Times wrote, "Pennant Roberts wasn’t one of Who's most dynamic directors, but he was shrewd at casting. He'd assign more roles to women than sci-fi scripts usually demanded and give many young actors a break." He was also responsible for the casting of Louise Jameson as the companion Leela, having previously interviewed her for a role on Survivors.

A fluent speaker of Welsh, he was also active in the Welsh television industry and moved to Cardiff in 1994.

Roberts was active within the Directors' and Producers' Rights Society and chair of the body for many years. Following his death, fellow director Piers Haggard described him as "a warm and committed man" who "served his fellow film and TV directors for more than 30 years with enormous dedication."
