= John Lee (Australian actor) =

Australian actor (1928–2000)

- Born: 31 March 1928; Launceston, Tasmania, Australia
- Died: 21 December 2000 (aged 72); Melbourne, Victoria, Australia
- Occupation: Actor
- Years active: 1956–1999

John Lee (31 March 1928 – 21 December 2000) was an Australian actor with an extensive career in film and television in Australia as well as the United Kingdom and the United States.

He is remembered for his roles on television, including Andrew Reynolds in Prisoner, Inspector Ian Timms in Cop Shop, Len Mangel in Neighbours and Philip Stewart in Return to Eden.

He also worked in the United Kingdom throughout the 1960s and 1970s, appearing in series such as The Avengers, The Troubleshooters, Doomwatch, Marked Personal, Warship, Survivors and Wilde Alliance. He played Alydon in the 1963–64 Doctor Who serial The Daleks, which was shown in colour on 23 November 2023 on BBC4.

== Filmography ==
=== Film ===
Year	Title	Role	Notes
1956	Beyond the River	Jenkins	
1957	Cat Girl	Allan	
1957	Short Cut to Hell	Porter	Uncredited
1957	The Flying Scot	Young man	
1958	The Silent Enemy	Flag Lieutenant	
1960	Under Ten Flags	Unknown	
1961	Seven Keys	Pat Jefferson	
1961	The Secret Partner	Clive Lang	
1963	Dr. Crippen	Harry Fawcett	
1963	A Stitch in Time	Police Constable	Uncredited
1965	Spaceflight IC-1	Dr. Garth	
1969	Crossplot	Blake	
1970	Say Hello to Yesterday	Woman's husband	Uncredited
1975	Yuppi du	Unknown	
1975	Pure S	Man in beanie	
1977	Double Exposure	Financier Rothman	
1980	Deadline	Katzer's Assistant	
1980	North Sea Hijack	Phillips	
1984	Street Hero	Vice Principal	
1986	Comrades	Juggler	
1988	Rikky and Pete	High Ranking Officer	
1993	Hammers Over the Anvil	Charles McAlister	
1997	The Castle	Chairman	

=== Television ===
Year	Title	Role	Notes
1958	Adventures of the Sea Hawk	Peter Seaforth	Season 1: (26 episodes)
1958 1959 1960	ITV Play of the Week	Octavius Robinson	Season 4, episode 3: "Man and Superman" Season 5: (2 episodes)
1959	The Flying Doctor	David Reid	Season 1, episode 9: "The Changing Plain"
1959	Rendezvous	Flight Lieutenant Roberts	Season 1, episode 31: "Blind Landing"
1959	Glencannon	First Officer	Season 1, episode 25: "Mutiny on the Inchcliffe Castle"
1960	International Detective	Jeff Morgan	Season 1, episode 11: "The Brenner Case"
1960	The Probation Officer	Unknown	Season 1, episode 34
1960	BBC Sunday-Night Play	John Willocks	Season 1, episode 20: "Twentieth Century Theatre: Aren't We All"
1960	Golden Girl	John Redfield	Season 1, episode 3: "Snatch"
1960	Danger Man	Tony Mayne	Season 1, episode 1: "View from the Villa"
1961	Top Secret	Hendrickson	Season 1, episode 11: "The Little One Is Dangerous"
1961	Emergency-Ward 10	Mark Dene	Season 1, episode 488
1962	The Net	Jim Howarth	Season 1: (6 episodes)
1963	It Happened Like This	Jack Tennant	Season 1, episode 13: "The Black Monk"
1963	Sergeant Cork	Cartwright	Season 1, episode 13: "The Case of the Gold Salseman"
1964	Doctor Who	Alydon	Season 1: (5 episodes)
1964	Theatre 625	S.S. Block Leader	Season 1, episode 3: "The Materialists"
1964	Armchair Theatre	Dr. Fancy	Season 5, episode 1: "The Trial of Dr. Fancy"
1964	The Wednesday Play	Werner von Haeften	Season 1, episode 8: "The July Plot"
1966	Court Martial	Herr Heinecke	Season 1, episode 7: "The Logistics of Survival"
1967 1968	Man in a Suitcase	The Killer Inspector Glen	Season 1: (2 episodes)
1967 1968	The Avengers	Mark Pearson Dr. Soames	Season 5, episode 5: "The Bird Who Knew Too Much" Season 7, episode 1: "The Forget-Me-Knot"
1967 1969	ITV Playhouse	Parker Franz Hasendorfen	Season 1, episode 1: "Lord Windermere's Fan" Season 2, episode 39: "Remember the Germans"
1967 1969	Softly Softly	Sanders Controller	Season 3, episode 9: "The Hunt" Season 5, episode 4: "Error of Judgement"
1968	The Champions	Ambulance Doctor	Season 1, episode 8: "To Trap a Rat"
1969	Paul Temple	Inspector Dyer	Season 1, episode 6: "Which One if Us Is Me?"
1969 1970	The Troubleshooters	Ronnie Darling Simon Broadsword	Season 5, episode 13: "You Want a Clockwork Nightingale" Season 6, episode 15: "Hey, We've Got a Problem Here|"
1970	Softly, Softly: Task Force	Colonel Banks	Season 2, episode 10: "Who Wants Pride...?"
1970 1971 1972	Doomwatch	Captain Jenson Dr. Cordell	Season 1, episode 1: "The Plastic Eaters" Season 2, episode 8: "The Web of Fear" Season 3, episode 10: "Cause of Death"
1972	ITV Sunday Night Theatre	Dr. Parker	Season 4, episode 26: "The Rose Garden"
1972	Dead of Night	Priest	Season 1, episode 7: "A Woman Sobbing"
1973	Matlock Police	Paul Bell	Season 1, episode 115: "Jeff's Missing"
1973- 1977	Warship	Lieutenant Commander Bill Kiley	Season 1: (3 episodes) Season 2: (4 episodes) Season 3: (8 episodes) Season 4: (5 episodes)
1974	Marked Personal	Richard Mason	Season 1: (10 episodes)
1975	Quiller	Sir Michael Foster	Season 1, episode 7: "Target North"
1976	When the Boat Comes In	Major Rupert Routledge	Season 1, episode 10: "Knight for a Day"
1976	ITV Sunday Night Drama	Lennox	Season 1, episode 61: "The Nicest Man in the World"
1977	Survivors	Philip Hurst	Season 3, episode 6: "Reunion"
1977	Jubilee	Conrad Jacobs	Season 1, episode 7: "Our Kid"
1977	Cop Shop	Inspector Ian Timms	112 episodes
1978	Wilde Alliance	Christopher Bridgewater	Season 1: (8 episodes)
1978	The Birds Fall Down	Edward	Season 1: (2 episodes)
1978	A Horseman Riding By	Major Barcley-Jones	Season 1, episode 9: "1915: Death of a Hero"
1980	Prisoner: Cell Block H	Andrew Reynolds	Season 1: (10 episodes)
1980	Breakaway	Norman Harris	Season 1: (6 episodes)
1980	A Question of Guilt	Mr. Beal	Season 1: (2 episodes)
1980	Escape	UnknownPeter	Season 1: (2 episodes)
1980	The Last Outlaw	Father Gibney	Unknown
1981	BBC2 Playhouse	Jim	Season 7, episode 10: "One Hundred and Eighty!!!"
1981	Goodbye Darling	Edward Partington	Season 1, episode 4: "Brenda"
1981	A Town Like Alice	Lester Robinson	Season 1: (3 episodes)
1982	A Shifting Dreaming	Unknown	TV movie
1983	Return to Eden	Phillip Stewart	TV mini-series (2 episodes)
1985	One Summer Again	Unknown	TV movie
1986	Return to Eden	Philip Stewart	Season 1: (7 episodes)
1987	The Flying Doctors	Roger Manning	Season 3, episode 32: "Sapphire"
1988	All the Way	Sir Peter Edwin	(Unknown)
1988 1994	Neighbours	Graeme Clifford Len Mangel	(10 episodes)
1989	Darlings of the Gods	Doctor	TV movie
1989	Mission: Impossible	Harris	Season 2, episode 2: "The Golden Serpent: Part 2"
1990	Flair	Judge	TV mini-series
1992	Acropolis Now	William	Season 5: "2 episodes"
1992	The Leaving of Liverpool	Patron	TV movie
1993	The Feds: Terror	Brigadier Lance Talbot	TV movie
1994 1997	Blue Heelers	Clive McLean Arthur Starling	Season 1, episode 40: "Without Intent" Season 4, episode 14: "Grave Matters"
1995	Snowy River: The McGregor Saga	Mr. Halloran	Season 3, episode 2: "Rough Passage"
1997	Everybody Loves Raymond	Wo-Hop	Season 2, episode 9: "The Gift"
1998	Moby Dick	Captain Bildad	TV mini-series
