= Frederick Hall (actor) =

British actor (1923–1995)

Frederick Hall (10 May 1923 – 28 November 1995) was a British actor.

His television credits include: Public Eye, Z-Cars, Doomwatch, Spy Trap, Survivors, The Enigma Files, Bergerac, Doctor Who (in the serial The Awakening) and Boon, as well as playing PC Fred Hallam in early episodes of Emmerdale Farm.

== Filmography ==
=== Film ===
Year	Production	Role	Notes
1987	Wish You Were Here	Passenger with Brolly	Feature film

=== Television ===
Year	Production	Role	Notes
1974	The Top Secret Life of Edgar Briggs	Harris	E10: "The Drawing"
1973	Bowler	Barman	E9: "Sweet and Sour Charity"
1973	Sir Yellow	The King's Chamberlain	E3: "Ye Turn of Ye Worm"
1972	Queenie's Castle	Policeman	S3 E3: "The One That Got Away"
1972	On the Buses	The Manager	S6 E4: "Stan's Worst Day"
1971	Doctor at Large	Guard	E24: "It's the Rich Wot Get the Pleasure"
1970	The Worker	Brownlow	S3 E2: "You Have Enjoyed The Sweets, Now You Must Suffer The Sours"

- Source: British Comedy Guide.
