= Morris Perry =

British actor (1925–2021)

- Born: Frank Morris Perry; 28 March 1925; Bromley, Kent, England
- Died: 19 September 2021 (aged 96); London, England
- Education: Old Vic Theatre School
- Occupation: Actor
- Spouse: Margaret Ashcroft (m. 1953; died 2016)
- Children: 4

Frank Morris Perry (28 March 1925 – 19 September 2021) was a British actor, best known for his roles on television.Perry was born in Bromley, Kent, England, and trained at the Old Vic Theatre School. His TV credits include City Beneath the Sea, The Avengers, Z-Cars, Champion House, The Champions, The Persuaders!, The Hound of the Baskervilles, Doctor Who, Doomwatch, Special Branch, The Sweeney, Survivors, The Professionals, Secret Army, Reilly, Ace of Spies, The Bill, Midsomer Murders and Not Going Out. His film credits include Nothing But the Night (1973), One Hour to Zero (1976), Sweeney! (1977), The Human Factor (1979), Silver Dream Racer (1980), The Bunker (1981) and Crush (2001). In 2004 he appeared in the BAFTA award-winning short film Letters of Service.

In 1953, Perry wed British actress Margaret Ashcroft, and they remained married until her death in 2016. They had four children.

Perry died on 19 September 2021, aged 96.

== Filmography ==
Year	Title	Role	Notes
1971	The Insomniac	The Man	
1973	Nothing But the Night	Dr. Yeats	
1973	Si può essere più bastardi dell'ispettore Cliff?		
1976	One Hour to Zero	Professor Stonely	
1977	Sweeney!	Flying Squad Cdr. Maynon	
1979	The Human Factor	Scientist	
1979	Secret Army	Maitre Guissard	
1980	Silver Dream Racer	Financier	
1981	The Bunker	Dr. Haase	TV movie
1982	The Hound of the Baskervilles	Barrymore	
1987	Born of Fire	The Director	
1992	Die Tigerin	Walker	
2001	Crush	Bishop	
2002	Fogbound	Older man	
2003	Rosenstrasse	Tänzer im Club / Dancer in Club	
2010	The Debt	Ivan Schevchuk	
