= Julie Neubert =

British actress

Julie Neubert is a British actress, known for playing the ill-fated Wendy in the first series of Survivors in 1975.

Other regular roles have included playing Judy Matthews in Family Affairs and Joan Hope in Brookside. Her other television credits include: Shoestring, Inspector Morse, Harbour Lights, Softly, Softly and Doomwatch. In 2019, she appeared in an episode of Doctors as Ruth Webster.
