= Margaret Ashcroft =

British actress (1931–2016)

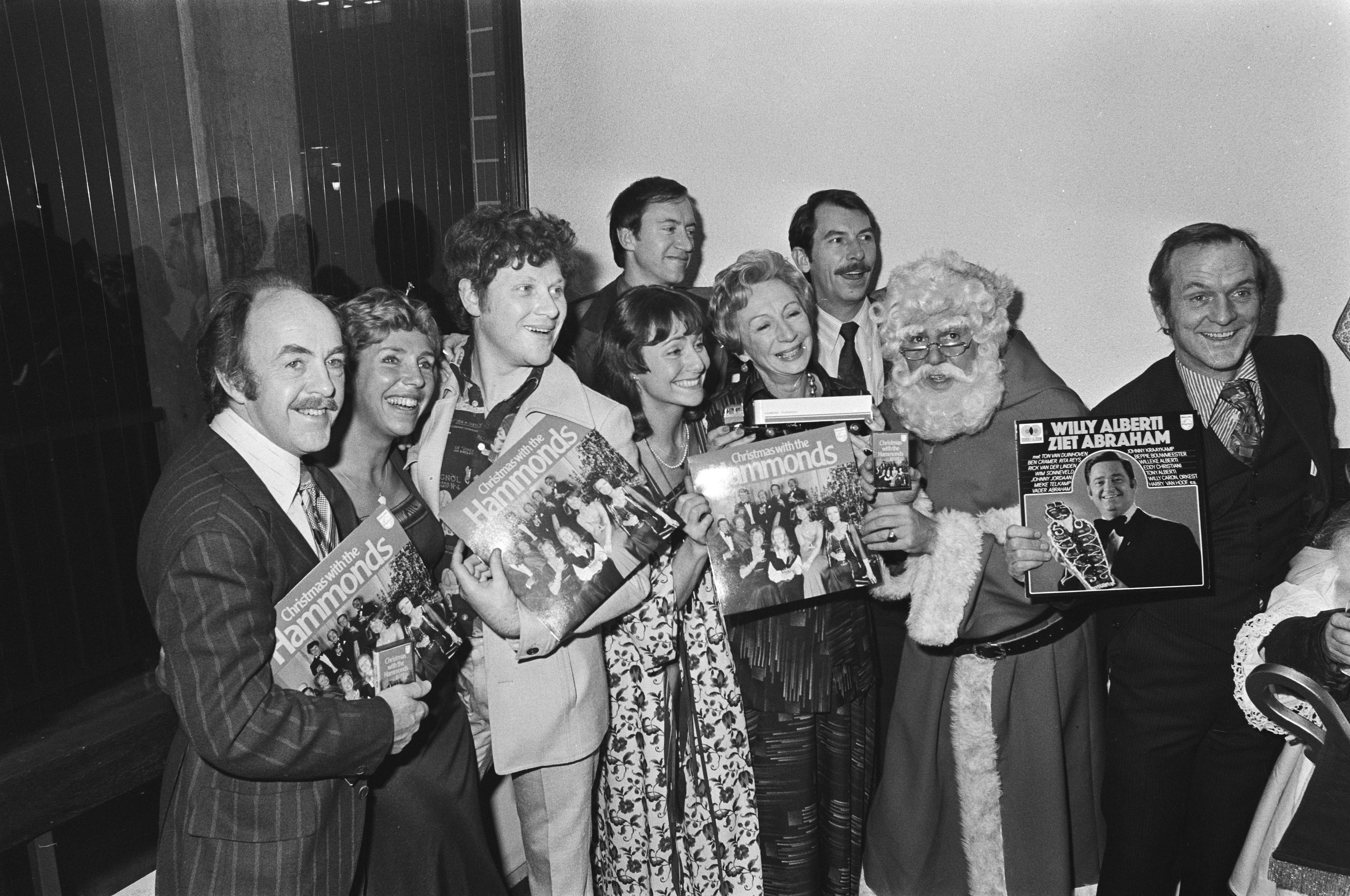
- Ashcroft (2nd from left) in 1972
- Born: 16 February 1931; Chelsea, London, England
- Died: 25 October 2016 (aged 85); Homerton, London, England
- Education: Old Vic Theatre School
- Occupation: Television actress
- Years active: 1957–2016
- Spouse: Morris Perry (m. 1953)
- Children: 4

Margaret Ashcroft (16 February 1931 – 25 October 2016) was a British television actress, who trained at the Old Vic Theatre School. She played the role of Margaret Castleton in the ITV series The Main Chance between 1969 and 1975 and the role of Gwen Riley in The Brothers between 1974 and 1976.

In 1953, Ashcroft married British actor Morris Perry and they remained married until her death in 2016.

== Selected television appearances ==
- The Brothers
- Van der Valk
- Doomwatch
- The Main Chance
- McCallum
- Armchair Theatre
