= Lorna Lewis (actress) =

American actress

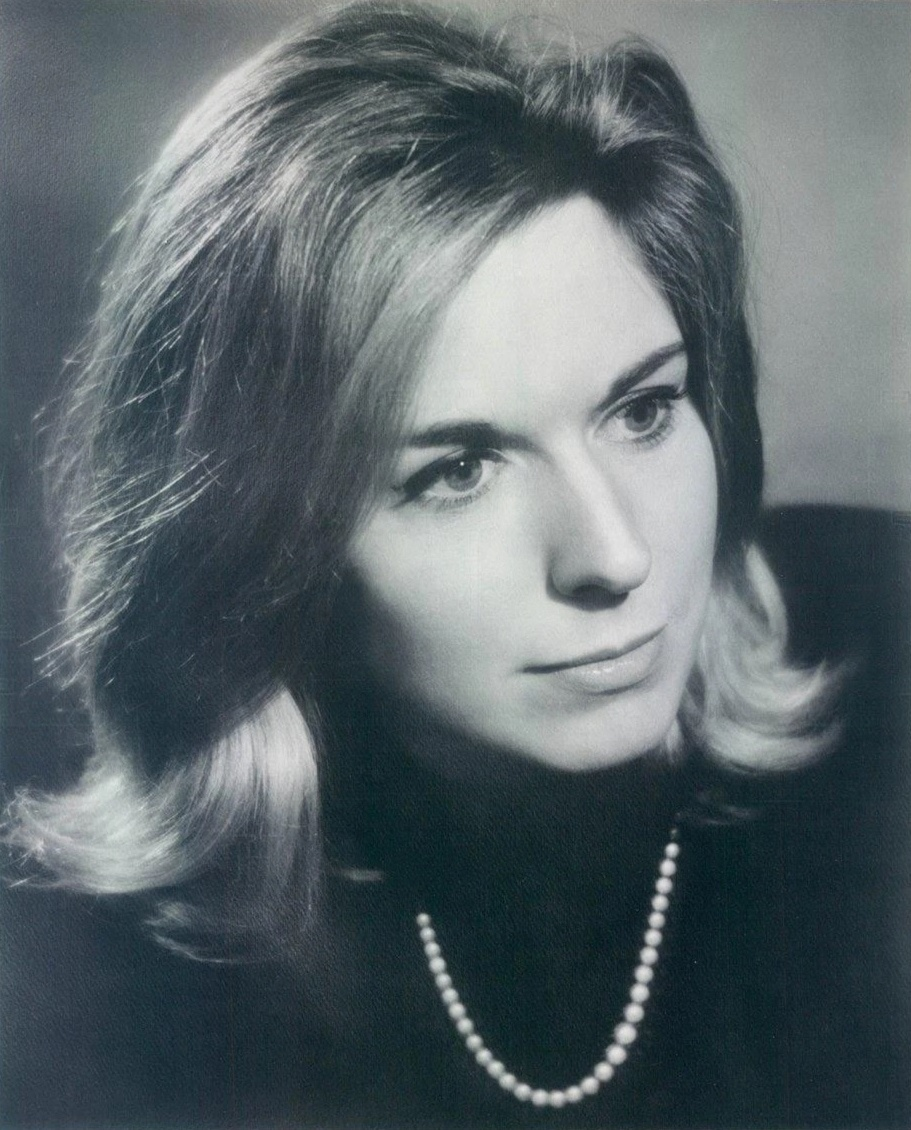
- Lewis in 1964
- Born: 1940; Surrey, England
- Died: June 2013 (aged 72–73); Kent, England
- Occupation: Actress
- Years active: 1960s–1985

Lorna Lewis (1940–2013), also known as Lorna Christina Cleveland, was a British-American television actress who also appeared on Broadway. She remains best known for her role as Pet Simpson in the BBC television drama Survivors between 1976 and 1977.

== Early life and education ==
Lewis was born in Surrey in England in 1940. During the Second World War, she was evacuated to her grandmother's farm in County Leix, Ireland, where she later spent many holidays. For a period, she was educated at Ryton Hall in Shropshire, England.

Her father, E. W. B. Lewis, was with the Royal Air Force and later worked in finance at Westinghouse International. In 1949, her family moved to Forest Hills, Queens, where she attended high school, and trained at a teachers' college in New Paltz, New York.

She graduated from the Royal Academy of Dramatic Art in London.

== Career ==
In 1963, Lewis appeared on Broadway opposite Albert Finney in Luther by John Osborne.

In addition to Survivors, er other television work includes: The Wild Wild West, Doomwatch, Mixed Blessings and Maelstrom. She appeared in an episode of Adam-12.

She retired from acting in the late 1980s and entered the priesthood, having been ordained as a Deacon Curate in 2003 in the parish of Wye in Kent, England. She resigned from the post in 2013.

== Filmography ==
- Overlord (1975)
