= Don Shaw (screenwriter) =

British screenwriter and playwright (born 1934)

- Born: 1934 (age 91–92)
- Occupation: Television writer

Don Shaw is a British screenwriter and playwright. His credits include Survivors, Doomwatch, Orde Wingate, Dangerfield and Bomber Harris. Shaw stated that before he took on writing for Survivors, 'I was very much an up-and-coming hot-shot writer. I was being sought after by The Wednesday Play and Play for Today and things like that.'

== Awards ==
In 1990 Shaw was nominated for a Bafta for his work on the TV film Bomber Harris.
