= Survivors (1975 TV series) =

British TV drama series (1975–1977)

- The main title caption seen throughout the series
- Created by: Terry Nation
- Starring: Ian McCulloch; Lucy Fleming; Carolyn Seymour; Denis Lill; John Abineri; Celia Gregory; Lorna Lewis
- Theme music composer: Anthony Isaac
- Country of origin: United Kingdom
- Original language: English
- No. of series: 3
- No. of episodes: 38

Production
- Producer: Terence Dudley
- Running time: 48–50 minutes
- Production company: BBC

Original release
- Network: BBC One
- Release: 16 April 1975 – 8 June 1977

Related
- Survivors (2008)

Survivors is a British post-apocalyptic fiction drama television series created by Terry Nation and produced by Terence Dudley at the BBC, that was broadcast from 1975 to 1977. It concerns the plight of a group of people who have survived an apocalyptic plague pandemic, which was accidentally released by a Chinese scientist and quickly spread across the world via air travel. Referred to as "The Death", the plague kills approximately 4,999 out of every 5,000 human beings on the planet within a matter of weeks of being released.

== Production ==
=== History ===
The programme ran for three series and 38 episodes (series 1 and 2 comprised 13 episodes each, the third series just 12; budget cuts and technical problems reduced the planned last double episode to a single, as some scenes were lost during shooting). All series were broadcast on Wednesday evenings on BBC 1, from April 1975 to June 1977. Writer Terry Nation (whose work included many scripts for Doctor Who and Blake's 7) created the series, but he left the show after the first series due to disputes with producer Terence Dudley.

The series' main actors included Carolyn Seymour (Abby), Lucy Fleming (Jenny), Ian McCulloch (Greg), and Denis Lill (Charles). The child actor Stephen Dudley (John) was given his part by his father, the show's producer Terence Dudley; while the child actress Tanya Ronder (who in series 1 and 2 played Lizzie) is the daughter of Jack Ronder, who wrote eight episodes of Survivors. In addition, the few appearances of Greg and Jenny's baby son Paul on Survivors saw Lucy Fleming's real-life son Diggory appear as Paul, although uncredited. Notable guest stars in the series included Patrick Troughton, Peter Jeffrey, Brian Blessed, George Baker, Philip Madoc, Bryan Pringle, Iain Cuthbertson, Peter Bowles, Kevin McNally, Robert Fyfe, Denis Lawson, David Neilson, Peter Duncan, June Brown, David Troughton, and Roger Lloyd-Pack.

In a High Court case in the mid-1970s, which was abandoned by both sides due to escalating costs, writer Brian Clemens claimed that he had told Terry Nation the concept for the series in the late 1960s and had registered the idea with the Writers' Guild of Great Britain in 1965. Nation strenuously denied this.

A BBC Four documentary, entitled The Cult of... Survivors, featuring interviews with actors Lucy Fleming, Ian McCulloch, and Carolyn Seymour, director Pennant Roberts, and scriptwriter Martin Worth, was broadcast on 5 December 2006, as part of the channel's Science Fiction Britannia series.

=== Locations ===
The majority of the locations for all three series of Survivors were in the Welsh Marches, the counties of Monmouthshire, Shropshire, Powys, and, for the first two series, the characters most often seen in Herefordshire. The first episode of series 1 ("The Fourth Horseman") featured several locations in Worcestershire, including Great Malvern railway station. Much of episode 2, "Genesis", was filmed around the village of Rose, Cornwall. Later episodes had the characters move around Herefordshire, from places like Ross-on-Wye to Welsh Newton Common. Llanarth Court in Monmouthshire was also featured. Brockhampton Court near How Caple, Herefordshire was used as "Waterhouse" in the episode "Garland's War". Towards the end of the first series, the action moved to a more permanent base at Hampton Court, again in Herefordshire. (This was the property referred to as "The Grange" by the characters.)

For the beginning of series 2 the focus moved to a new location, at Callow Hill Farm, near Monmouth (but again just within Herefordshire), as "Whitecross". The Lights of London episodes featured Hanwell railway station, The Oval, and other locations in London, while the Waterloo & City line and the Camden Town deep-level shelter were used to represent parts of the London Underground. The Monmouthshire and Brecon Canal and village of Skenfrith also made appearances.

During series 3, production occasionally moved further afield to Suffolk, Derbyshire, and Wiltshire, with the last episode filmed in the Scottish Highlands. Extensive use was made of the Severn Valley Railway.

There are a great number of technical and continuity errors visible as the series was shot quickly on early video cameras, which did not work well in the gloomy conditions in which much of the programme was shot. Two cameras were used, but one of them had a recurrent fault, which shows as multiple reflections on the left hand side of pictures in many scenes, particularly visible in series 3. Primitive equipment meant that many shots suffered from a green tint. Due to audience complaints about this, the production crew replaced the cameras.

=== 2008 version ===
In 2008, the BBC began airing a new version of Survivors, with Adrian Hodges as the main writer. In the credits, this version is said to be based on Terry Nation's novel Survivors (1976), rather than the previous series. This statement was made to avoid copyright problems, as the rights to the television series were vested with a different legal entity from the rights to the book.

The principal characters of Abby, Greg, Jenny and Tom Price were retained, but new elements were introduced, including a subplot about the origins of the virus and a stronger focus on action. The show took pains to make sure these characters represented a broader spread of racial and social backgrounds. The show received mixed reviews, but initial viewing figures were strong.

The 2008 series ran for two seasons, and the BBC announced in April 2010 that there would be no third series.

=== Audio drama version ===
In June 2014, Big Finish Productions released the first four-episode volume of an audio drama expansion of Survivors, with Seymour, McCulloch, and Fleming reprising their screen roles. The second and third volumes were released in 2015, and the fourth and fifth in 2016, with sixth and seventh volumes scheduled for 2017. On 21 December 2016, Big Finish announced an eighth and ninth volume to be released in 2018.

== Series overview ==
Series	Episodes	Originally released	
Series	Episodes	First released	Last released
1	13	16 April 1975	16 July 1975
2	13	31 March 1976	23 June 1976
3	12	16 March 1977	8 June 1977

== Episodes ==
=== Series 1 (1975) ===
As the world's population is almost annihilated by a mysterious pandemic, accidentally unleashed by an unnamed Chinese scientist, the crisis is first seen through the eyes of two characters—Jenny Richards, a young working woman in London who is naturally immune to the disease, and Abby Grant, a middle-class corporate wife living a comfortable existence in a suburban commuter village who caught the virus but barely recovered, while her husband died. As Abby goes in search of her son Peter, who was away at boarding school when the pandemic occurred, Jenny wanders aimlessly through the countryside.

Other major characters introduced in the first few episodes are the resourceful engineer Greg Preston, the shifty Welshman Tom Price, and two children, John Millon and Lizzie Willoughby. Abby, Jenny, and Greg eventually come together and realise they must start again from scratch now that the civilisation they once knew has been destroyed. After several adventures on the road, they find a property called The Grange which they can use as a base and, joined by other survivors, they form a potted community of disparate individuals all united by a shared purpose; to relearn the old skills of farming and tool-making, and to try to live in this new world.

==== Regular cast ====
- Carolyn Seymour as Abby Grant (eps. 1-13)
- Ian McCulloch as Greg Preston (eps. 2-13)
- Lucy Fleming as Jenny Richards (eps. 1-13)
- Talfryn Thomas as Tom Price (eps. 1-3, 7-10)
- Tanya Ronder as Lizzie Willoughby (eps. 5-13)
- Stephen Dudley as John Millon (eps. 5-13)
- Hana-Maria Pravda as Emma Cohen (eps. 7-13)
- Julie Neubert as Wendy (eps. 7-9)
- John Hallett as Barney (eps. 7-9)
- Chris Tranchell as Paul Pitman (eps. 8-13)
- Terry Scully as Vic Thatcher (eps. 2, 8-10)
- Hugh Walters as Vic Thatcher (eps. 11, 13)
- Michael Gover as Arthur Russell (eps. 8-13)
- Eileen Helsby as Charmian Wentworth (eps. 8-13)
- Myra Frances as Anne Tranter (eps. 2, 11)
- Richard Heffer as Jimmy Garland (eps. 6, 13)

==== Guest cast ====
- Peter Bowles as David Grant (ep. 1)
- Peter Copley as Dr. Bronson (ep. 1)
- Christopher Reich as Dr. Andrew Tyler (ep. 1)
- Margaret Anderson as Mrs. Transon (ep. 1)
- Callum Mill as Dr. Gordon (ep. 1)
- Blake Butler as Mr. Pollard (ep. 1)
- Elizabeth Sinclair as Patricia (ep. 1)
- Giles Melville as Kevin Lloyd (ep. 1)
- Len Jones as First Youth (ep. 1)
- Brian Peck as Dave Long (eps. 2-3)
- George Baker as Arthur Wormley (ep. 2)
- Edward Brooks as Colonel (ep. 2)
- Peter Jolley as First Man (ep. 2)
- Barry Stanton as Reg Gunnel (ep. 3)
- Robert Gillespie as John Milner (ep. 3)
- Robert Fyfe as Phillipson (ep. 3)
- Graham Fletcher as Boy (ep. 3)
- Denis Lill as Charles Vaughan (ep. 4)
- Annie Hayes as Loraine (ep. 4)
- Yvonne Bonnamy as Isla (ep. 4)
- Keith Jayne as Mick (ep. 4)
- Emily Bolton as Tessa (ep. 4, as June Bolton)
- Maureen Nelson as Woman (ep. 4)
- Peter Miles as Lincoln (ep. 5)
- Frederick Hall as Jack (ep. 5)
- Nickolas Grace as Matthew (ep. 5)
- Kenneth Caswell as Robert (ep. 5)
- Peter Jeffrey as Knox (ep. 6)
- Dennis Chinnery as John Carroll (ep. 6)
- David Marsh as Bates (ep. 6, as David G. March)
- Michael Jamieson as Ken (ep. 6)
- Robert Oates as Harris (ep. 6)
- Susanna East as Betty (ep. 6)
- Roger Elliott as Sentry (ep. 6)
- Glyn Owen as Bernard Huxley (ep. 10)
- Caroline Burt as Laura Foster (ep. 10)
- Denis Lawson as Norman (ep. 10)
- James Hayes as Phil (ep. 10)
- Robert Tayman as Donnie (ep. 11)
- Matthew Long as Robert Lawson (ep. 12)
- Murray Hayne as Jim Buckmaster (ep. 12)
- Paul Chapman as Thorpe (ep. 12)
- Annie Irving as Ruth Anderson (ep. 13)
- Harry Markham as Burton (ep. 13)

==== Episodes ====
#	Title	Directed by	Written by	Designed by	Original airdate
1.01	"The Fourth Horseman"	Pennant Roberts	Terry Nation	Austin Ruddy & Val Warrender	16 April 1975
In an unspecified location, an enigmatic and unnamed Asian scientist accidentally smashes a bottle containing a deadly and unnatural virus. The disease quickly spreads across the world through air travel, infecting and killing thousands. In modern-day London, a young woman named Jenny visits her friend Andrew, a physician who is working in a city hospital, to ask him to come see a mutual friend, Pat, who has become ill. The hospital has suffered a high number of deaths from the mysterious disease, but the Home Secretary has instructed the hospital staff to keep it quiet, telling the public it is merely a flu epidemic. Soon, civilization begins to collapse as the deaths increase, mass absenteeism affects public services, and amenities and the electronic media go off air. Eventually the electricity shuts off, and all public services falter then eventually cease entirely. Jenny and Andrew return to Pat's home to find she has died from the disease, and Andrew reveals the true extent of the situation to Jenny: he too has got the disease, the virus is wiping out thousands, and there is nothing anyone can to do stop or cure it. Andrew orders Jenny, who has displayed an immunity to the virus, to leave London as fast as possible as the countless dead bodies will spread more diseases which she is vulnerable to. Jenny packs her bags and leaves for the country to look for more survivors. In a country village outside of London, another young woman, Abby Grant, becomes ill with the sickness and wakes after several days in a coma to find seemingly everyone (including her husband) in her town has died. Abby goes in search of her son who was at boarding school. There she meets the sole remaining staff member at the school, Dr. Bronson. He tells her that the healthy boys were taken camping by another teacher in the hope of escaping the epidemic. Dr. Bronson believes that those who survive the epidemic will need to re-learn old skills that have been lost in modern society, if they are to survive long-term. While Abby proposes that there will be stockpiles of energy sources and preserved food, he explains that every product used in contemporary society relies on the complex interworking of thousands of people in different regions, each having specialised knowledge and a constant supply of materials – all of which have suddenly vanished. Despondent, Abby drives home and decides to move on in search of other survivors. She cuts her hair short, packs some essentials, then burns down her house, which contains her husband's body, and drives away.
1.02	"Genesis"	Gerald Blake	Terry Nation	Ray London	23 April 1975
Survivor Greg Preston, who has just returned from mainland Europe and knows the virus has wiped out the population there, arrives home to find that his wife, Jeanie, has died from the plague. Greg is driving through the countryside when he meets Anne, who begs him to come and help the man she is staying with, Vic, who has been injured. Greg goes with her to the quarry where she has been staying and finds that Vic's legs have been crushed under a fallen tractor. Greg helps the best he can. Meanwhile, Abby arrives at a settlement run by a former trade union president, Arthur Wormley, and learns that he has some inside knowledge of the catastrophe from his contacts in the government. He has set up a small community where he has appointed himself the man in charge of the entire area. At first interested at their intentions, Abby is later appalled when a man branded as a threat to Wormley's group is taken out and shot. Abby flees the house. Greg has driven to the nearest town to get medicine. While there he meets Jenny and takes her into his car after she collapses. En route back to the quarry, they encounter Anne, who tells Greg that Vic is dead, and after initially travelling with them, she leaves. Greg and Jenny see smoke and aim for it. It leads them to Abby, who has now set herself up in an abandoned church with the aim of starting a self-sufficient community.
1.03	"Gone Away"	Terence Williams	Terry Nation	Richard Morris	30 April 1975
Abby, Jenny and Greg drive to the nearest large supermarket to stock up on food. While there, they come up against some armed men who are working on Wormley's behalf. The men threaten to shoot them if they take the food and insist they sign up at the community. Abby refuses, and her group manages to overcome the men and escape. Arriving back at the church they find a tramp, Tom Price, has taken shelter at their house. He agrees to join them and help. He tells them of a young boy he encountered who Abby hopes may be her son. Abby, Greg, and Jenny go to find him but discover he is dead, but is not Abby's son. While away, Wormley's men have discovered their base and wait for their return. Tom agrees to join their settlement, and they begin trashing Abby's group's possessions. Abby, Jenny, and Greg return, but one of Wormley's men warns them not to enter the church, so the trio waits in the dark until the gang leaves. Fearing for their safety they leave the area the next day, with Abby vowing to continue searching for her son.
1.04	"Corn Dolly"	Pennant Roberts	Jack Ronder	Austin Ruddy	7 May 1975
Abby, Jenny and Greg are driving towards Abby's home town of Brimpsfield, looking for her son. At a petrol station they find posters for a nearby settlement. They run across settlement members, Charles and Loraine, who themselves have just found a young boy, Mick. Greg, Abby, and Jenny decide to accompany them to Maredell before deciding whether to join forces. On arrival, they discover that many in the settlement have become mortally ill from poisoned fish. They soon learn that Charles is obsessed with repopulating the earth and is trying to impregnate as many women as possible to achieve this goal. His intentions now turn to Abby, who is horrified. The trio leaves the following day.
1.05	"Gone to the Angels"	Gerald Blake	Jack Ronder	Ray London	14 May 1975
While Abby goes to her son's school, Jenny and Greg run across two small children, John and Lizzie, who have been living in the home of John's dead grandmother. When they all go up to the school to meet Abby, the children tell them about a bus full of school children who have gone up to Derbyshire, "where the angels are". They all take off to the area and find a house to stay in, but Greg is accidentally shot by a man who took shelter there, Lincoln, who's given Greg a minor flesh wound. The man tells the group that armed men calling themselves "The British Government" recently came, taking many of his supplies. Abby leaves on her own and finds the "angels", three religious men who have isolated themselves in the hills. Later, when Jenny, Greg, and the children set out to follow Abby, Lincoln takes Lizzie hostage, but she is saved by her dog. The group leaves Lincoln behind and rejoins Abby at the "angels'" cabin. However, the men quickly become ill, and they realise Abby has brought the plague with her and infected them. The five travellers leave after the three men have died.
1.06	"Garland's War"	Terence Williams	Terry Nation	Richard Morris	21 May 1975
Abby accidentally gets involved in a local war when she picks up a wounded man being chased by a group of armed men. They shoot one of Abby's tyres as she escapes. The man, Jimmy Garland, takes Abby to the cave where he has been staying: there is instant chemistry between the pair. He is the rightful owner of the Waterhouse manor but has been evicted by a larger group, led by Knox. While Jimmy is finding another vehicle for Abby she is captured by Knox, who convinces her his intentions for Garland's estate are reasonable and honourable, and she agrees to find Jimmy and play mediator between them. Jimmy, however, has kidnapped one of Knox's women as collateral for Abby. Abby brings Jimmy to Knox, but his men attack and restrain him. Abby leaves, and finds Greg, Jenny and the children looking for her. Back at the manor, Knox is torturing Jimmy to reveal the whereabouts of the girl. As the men go to the hut to retrieve the girl, they are surprised as Greg bursts through the door with a shotgun, demanding that Knox's men let Jimmy go. They make the exchange and escape, though Jimmy insists he must stay to continue fighting his "war".
1.07	"Starvation"	Pennant Roberts	Jack Ronder	Robert Berk	4 June 1975
Wendy, a young woman living with an older woman, Emma, leaves their house in search of food. She comes across Tom Price, who offers her food in return for favours. Uneasy about him, she steals his fish and runs away. Meanwhile, Abby rescues Emma from a pack of roaming, savage dogs. Tom turns up at the house looking for Wendy. After he threatens Abby, she locks him in the back of his van. The others have found a large manor house with plenty of land for grazing nearby sheep and growing vegetables. They settle there and meet Barney, a simple-minded and scared young man. Abby brings Emma and Wendy in Tom's van to the manor, and there they release Tom, who agrees, once again, to help them.
1.08	"Spoil of War"	Gerald Blake	Clive Exton (as M.K. Jeeves)	Richard Morris	11 June 1975
With a community now numbering nine people, Abby, Jenny and Greg begin working the land in an attempt to begin growing crops, while the others take on various chores around the manor. A man, Paul Pitman, arrives and tells them he knows about farming and tells them their methods are futile, but he can help. They need seeds and tractor parts. Greg remembers that Vic Thatcher, whom he had helped earlier, had a working tractor. Greg, Tom, Barney and Paul go to Vic's quarry to see what they can get there. On arriving they are repeatedly shot at but manage to get through to find that Vic is still alive, although his legs are completely crushed. Vic tries to kill Greg for abandoning him and taking away his woman, until Greg explains what really happened. Vic agrees to let them take the equipment and food he has stored, and he accompanies them back to the manor. Meanwhile, two more people, Arthur and Charmian, have joined the community.
1.09	"Law and Order"	Pennant Roberts	Clive Exton (as M.K. Jeeves)	Richard Morris	18 June 1975
It is May Day, and Abby decides that the community should celebrate with a party, including alcohol. During the party, Tom gets very drunk and later attempts to sexually assault Wendy, chasing her up the stairs and into her room. During a struggle, he stabs and kills her. Shocked at the discovery of Wendy's body the next morning, the others notice that Barney is acting strangely, and put Barney on trial. The nine other adults in the community hold a vote on whether Barney is guilty or not guilty of killing Wendy. They come to the conclusion by six votes to three that Barney is guilty (Abby, Greg, Paul, Vic, Arthur and Charmian vote for guilty, while Jenny, Emma and Tom vote for not guilty). After the guilty verdict, they then hold another vote on whether Barney should be banished from the community or executed. They vote by 5 votes to 4 that Barney be executed (Abby, Greg, Paul, Vic and Arthur vote for execution, while Jenny, Emma, Tom and Charmian vote for banishment). Greg pulls the short straw, and Greg takes Barney outside and shoots him dead. Wracked with guilt, Tom confesses to Abby and Greg that it was he who killed Wendy. Furious, but logical, Greg reasons that Tom's crime should not be revealed to others, and Tom should be kept within the community, as his poaching skills are essential. Greg also warns Abby that he will challenge her leadership if she tells the others the truth. Despite Abby's disgust, she agrees with Greg.
1.10	"The Future Hour"	Terence Williams	Terry Nation	Richard Morris	25 June 1975
Greg and Paul arrive at a temporary settlement packed with provisions. It is led by Huxley, who travels around different communities offering food and other items in exchange for gold. Meanwhile, a man and woman, named Norman and Laura, have arrived at the manor seeking shelter. Laura is pregnant, and the group is on the run from Huxley, who has taken Laura as his woman but insists on her getting rid of the baby. Abby and the others agree to hide them at the settlement. Huxley tracks down Laura and Norman, and wages war on the manor. Laura has the baby and agrees to return to the settlement along with Norman, but entrusts her baby girl to the community where she will be safe, but not before Tom and Huxley are both killed in a final showdown.
1.11	"Revenge"	Gerald Blake	Jack Ronder	Richard Morris	2 July 1975
After Vic attempts suicide, the others discuss how depressed he has become and set about finding useful tasks to give him a sense of purpose, such as teaching the children. Additionally, Greg and Paul go to a nearby town and find Vic a proper wheelchair. Two people turn up at the manor driving a tanker full of petrol. One is a young man, Donny, the other is Anne – the woman who had left Vic to die. Vic tells the others what she did, and Abby decides that Donny can stay but Anne must leave in the morning. That night, Anne attempts to kill Vic, who in turn also tries to kill her in anger. After both break down in tears, they talk. The following morning, a seemingly more positive Anne leaves the house, watched by Vic.
1.12	"Something of Value"	Terence Williams	Terry Nation	Richard Morris	9 July 1975
A man, Robert Lawson, arrives at the manor for shelter and the group agree he can stay. During the night he looks around and soon finds the tanker of petrol. After a heavy downpour, the others find that the crops have been washed out and the store of food in the cellar has been flooded and destroyed. They decide that the petrol is very valuable and decide to trade it to a nearby community for food and seed. Meanwhile, Lawson has met up with two friends and tells them of the tanker. They return to the manor to get it, but Greg has already left with it. They follow, but after a failure of the brakes, Greg has parked it in a barn. The three men find him, steal the tanker, and drive away, speeding down a hill. The truck's brakes fail to work and two of the men are killed. The third opens the fuel tank, allowing the petrol to spill onto the ground and states his intention to spill all of it, and Greg shoots him dead. Members of Greg's group drive up, and they retrieve their petrol.
1.13	"A Beginning"	Pennant Roberts	Terry Nation	Richard Morris	16 July 1975
The group are becoming irritable with each other after trading their petrol for some seed which turns out to be bad, and a fox has killed their chickens. Abby, tired of her role as the leader, retreats and talks it over with Jenny, who reveals she is pregnant with Greg's child. A wandering group arrives and requests shelter for a sick woman they are carrying. The group says they were driven from their land by a large band of thieves roaming the area. Greg and the others in his group agree to contact other settlements so they can band together and form an alliance against similar attacks. Abby meanwhile, needing some peace, leaves the settlement to seek out Jimmy Garland, and stays with him in his house. Back at the settlement, the sick girl, Ruth, recovers and tells them she was a medical student; she mentions that she was staying on a barge with some other people, one of whom was a boy named Peter Grant. Abby returns the next day with Jimmy. Jenny rushes out to tell her the news that her son is still alive.

=== Series 2 (1976) ===
Having received word that her son is still alive, Abby has left the Grange to resume her search. Meanwhile, the community is devastated by a fire that kills many, including Emma, Charmian and Vic. The survivors join another community, Whitecross, run by Charles Vaughan, and become once more focused on the everyday practicalities of post-Death life. New major characters comprising the Whitecross band are Charles' partner Pet Simpson, travelling doctor Ruth Anderson and farmyard labourer Hubert Goss. Frequent visitors to Whitecross, both friendly and hostile, act as catalysts for various dramatic situations. Finally, the arrival of Norwegian survivors brings the possibility of re-establishing worldwide contact and technology. To achieve this, Greg departs Whitecross in a hot air balloon bound for Norway.

==== Regular cast ====
- Ian McCulloch as Greg Preston (eps. 1-8, 10-13)
- Denis Lill as Charles Vaughan (eps. 1-13)
- Lucy Fleming as Jenny Richards (eps. 1-3, 5, 7-8, 11-13)
- Celia Gregory as Ruth Anderson (eps. 1-6, 8, 10-13)
- Lorna Lewis as Pet Simpson (eps. 1-2, 5-13)
- John Abineri as Hubert Goss (eps. 1, 5-8, 11-13)
- Michael Gover as Arthur Russell (eps. 1-2, 5, 7-8, 11)
- Tanya Ronder as Lizzie Willoughby (eps. 1-2, 5-8, 10-13)
- Stephen Dudley as John Millon (eps. 1-2, 5-8, 10-13)
- Gordon Salkilld as Jack Wood (eps. 2, 5-6, 8, 11, 13)
- Chris Tranchell as Paul Pitman (eps. 1-2)
- Stephen Tate as Alan (eps. 8, 11-13)
- Heather Wright as Melanie (eps. 11-13)
- Roy Herrick as Lewis Fearns (eps. 8, 10)
- Delia Paton as Mina (eps. 6, 10)
- June Page as Sally (eps. 11-13)
- Gigi Gatti as Daniella (eps. 7-8, 12)
- Peter Duncan as Dave (eps. 11-13)
- Roger Monk as Pete (eps. 11-13)

==== Guest cast ====
- Coral Atkins as Penny (eps. 3-4)
- Nadim Sawalha as Amul (eps. 3-4)
- David Troughton as Stan (ep. 3)
- Patrick Holt as Doctor (eps. 3-4)
- Lennox Milne as Nessie (eps. 3-4)
- Sydney Tafler as Manny (eps. 3-4)
- Roger Lloyd-Pack as Wally (eps. 3-4)
- Wendy Williams as Barbara (eps. 3-4)
- Lloyd McGuire as George (eps. 3-4)
- Paula Williams as Maisie (ep. 3)
- John Line as Alistair McFadden (ep. 5)
- Catherine Finn as Peggy (ep. 6)
- Andy Bradford as Sniper (ep. 7)
- William Wilde as Boult (ep. 7)
- Vivienne Burgess as Mrs. McGregor (ep. 7)
- Paul Grist as Morris (ep. 7)
- Emrys Leyshon as Roberts (ep. 7)
- Julie Peasgood as Judy (ep. 8)
- Martin Neil as Philip (ep. 8)
- Philip Madoc as Max Kershaw (ep. 9)
- Clare Kelly as Joy Dunn (ep. 9)
- James Cosmo as Lenny Carter (ep. 9)
- David Goodland as Sammy Waters (ep. 9)
- David Neilson as Mike (ep. 9)
- Elizabeth Cassidy as Susan (ep. 9)
- David Sibley as Kim (ep. 9)
- Vanessa Millard as Nancy (ep. 9)
- Patrick Troughton as John Millen (ep. 10)
- Kevin McNally as Jeff Kane (ep. 10)
- Brian Grellis as Les Grice (ep. 10)
- Ian Hastings as Mark Carter (ep. 11)
- Linda Robson as Barbara (ep. 12)
- Nula Conwell as Ann (ep. 12)
- Sally Osborne as Agnes Carlsson (ep. 13, as Sally Osborn)
- Dan Meaden as Seth (ep. 13)

==== Episodes ====
#	Title	Directed by	Written by	Designed by	Original airdate
2.01	"Birth of a Hope"	Eric Hills	Jack Ronder	Ian Watson	31 March 1976
It is deep midwinter, and Abby has gone to reunite with her son. The manor burns down, and several of the group are killed. The survivors move on to a new settlement led by Charles Vaughan. Jenny is about to have Greg's baby, and he goes in search of Ruth to help with the delivery. Meanwhile, Charles and Greg talk about furthering their community for the future and working to become completely self-sufficient. Ruth is found as Jenny goes into labour.
2.02	"Greater Love"	Pennant Roberts	Don Shaw	Ian Watson	7 April 1976
Jenny has had a baby boy, whom she is naming David. However, she falls ill. Ruth examines her and makes a list of needed medical supplies. Paul agrees to go to the nearest big-city hospital (in Birmingham) to collect it. He returns with the items but is feeling feverish. Ruth isolates him and realises he has contracted the bubonic plague. To prevent the disease from spreading through the community she gives him a lethal injection and burns down the barn he was held in. Jenny, whose health has improved, decides to rename her baby Paul.
2.03	"Lights of London – Part 1"	Terence Williams	Jack Ronder	Peter Kindred & Geoffrey Winslow	14 April 1976
Ruth has been duped into going to London, where a community of 500 are living. They need her because of her medical training, as many people are falling ill, owing to rats and a mysterious, deadly "London sickness". The group are led by a duplicitous, manipulative operations manager named Manny, and a physician who informs Ruth that only a group numbering 500 or more can survive; a smaller community would become extinct within several generations. This argument and the clear need for another doctor tempt Ruth to stay, and she enjoys the settlement's electricity and running water. Greg and Charles learn that Ruth has been taken to London and go to rescue her. On arrival, they are attacked by a pack of rats.
2.04	"Lights of London – Part 2"	Pennant Roberts	Jack Ronder	Paul Allen	21 April 1976
Greg and Charles are rescued and taken to the community. They find Ruth, who explains that the 500 are planning to move to the Isle of Wight to set up a new life in a clean environment. They soon discover, however, that Manny has no intention of moving them and wants to stay in London as the ruler. He tells Greg and Charles to go, but Ruth must stay. Ruth decides to return to the country with Greg and Charles, and they try to make an escape with Manny in close pursuit. Manny is shot by one of his enemies, and Greg, Charles and Ruth leave London.
2.05	"The Face of the Tiger"	Terence Williams	Don Shaw	Ian Watson	28 April 1976
Tensions among the group are rising as the workload increases. A seemingly gentle man, Alistair, arrives and joins the group. Hubert, meanwhile, is feeling hard-done by and insists on better living accommodations until he discovers that Alistair is a convicted child killer named Andrew. The others question "Alistair", who admits his crime and says that he has been rehabilitated. Hubert, however, spreads panic among the others, and Alistair volunteers to leave.
2.06	"The Witch"	Terence Williams	Jack Ronder	Ian Watson	5 May 1976
One of the women in the community, Mina, is receiving much unwanted attention from Hubert, who has taken a liking to her. She shuts herself away with her baby, and Hubert begins to spread a rumour that she is a witch. A number of community members begin to believe this, and Mina decides to leave. Greg and Charles go looking for her and bring her back, assuring her that everyone regrets their suspicions. Hubert is tasked with grinding wheat.
2.07	"A Friend in Need"	Eric Hills	Ian McCulloch	Ian Watson	12 May 1976
Greg and Charles call a meeting with representatives from local communities with a view to the groups' helping each other out and providing protection from attack if needed. A sniper is going round other areas and shooting women. Greg realises they are the next target and calls on a nearby community for help. While waiting in ambush, Jenny is placed as bait for the sniper. Greg tries to strangle the sniper, who is shot in the struggle. The sniper is revealed to be a woman.
2.08	"By Bread Alone"	Pennant Roberts	Martin Worth	Ian Watson	19 May 1976
One of the community members, Lewis, reveals himself to be a parson, and he is interested in starting Sunday services. Many other community members, including Jenny, express opposition to this, with the view that religion is a waste of time now. However, despite their workload, the group gradually comes round to the idea and attends the first service.
2.09	"The Chosen"	Eric Hills	Roger Parkes	Ian Watson	26 May 1976
On their return trip from harvesting salt, Charles and Pet meet a sick couple whom they bring to the nearest community for help. There they find a military-like operation run by Max and Joy. The sick woman dies, and the sick man is shot. Charles complains of their domineering approach, though he proposes they conduct trade and form a federation. Joy invites Charles to present his proposal to the group, but then advises Max to order them to leave. Falsely tipped off by Joy that Max plans to have them shot during the night, the couple stays, and Charles gets to address the community, during which time Joy uses Max's supposed murder threat to depose him.
2.10	"Parasites"	Terence Williams	Roger Marshall	Ian Watson	2 June 1976
Mina becomes fond of John, a man she meets on a river barge, and agrees to meet him later, to serve him lunch in exchange for Wellington boots for the community. However, when the boat returns, two other men have taken residence, and John is nowhere to be found, though one of the men is wearing John's hat. The pair are brought to Whitecross but appear quite aggressive. Pet recognises one of them as a convicted criminal, and when Mina finds John's murdered corpse and confronts the pair, they take the children hostage. In an attempt to reason with them, Lewis goes to talk to them but is shot dead. Greg and Charles meet the men's demands and let them go, and the pair escape on the boat. However, they begin to suffer the effects of the wood alcohol they've been drinking and die.
2.11	"New Arrivals"	Pennant Roberts	Roger Parkes	Ian Watson	9 June 1976
Ruth brings to Whitecross a small group of young people, who've escaped the effects of an aggressive strain of flu that has devastated their own community. Their leader, Mark, has an agricultural degree and much experience in farming, and offers them advice. The flu bug soon breaks out at Whitecross, killing Arthur, and infecting Mina and Peggy. It soon becomes apparent that Mark is an overbearing leader and aims to take over the farming aspect of the community completely. The others vote against him, and he leaves.
2.12	"Over the Hills"	Eric Hills	Martin Worth	Ian Watson	16 June 1976
One of the new girls, Sally, is pregnant. Charles is delighted and re-ignites his interest in more of the community having children. There is much opposition to this from the women, including Sally, who forces herself to miscarry.
2.13	"New World"	Terence Williams	Martin Worth	Ian Watson	23 June 1976
A hot air balloon crash-lands at the community. The flier is killed, while his daughter wanders about in a nearby forest. Greg and the others go to investigate. The girl, Agnes, is found and explains that they have come from Norway. There, they have a working factory, manufacturing tools, and equipment, but little food. Much to Jenny's distress, Greg is keen to investigate and trade with them. After getting the balloon back in working order he accompanies Agnes on her return to Norway.

=== Series 3 (1977) ===
Having received word that Greg has returned to England from Norway and is injured, Charles and Jenny set out on horseback to find him. Warned by Jack that Charles and Jenny should turn back as they're heading into danger, Hubert sets out on horseback after Charles and Jenny. The trio's journey will take them right across what is left of the United Kingdom as their search leads them to various dead ends. However, they meet a broad spectrum of other survivors along the way, and the series continues to explore alternative reactions to the Death and what it takes to survive. The third series juxtaposes the personal story arc of the search for Greg with a wider narrative of society appearing to re-establish itself, with federated communities, market bartering and rudimentary railway travel, based on using the steam locomotives preserved on heritage railways. This culminates in the tentative return of law and order, and the quest to restore power through hydroelectricity.

==== Regular cast ====
- Denis Lill as Charles Vaughan (eps. 1, 3-9, 11-12)
- Lucy Fleming as Jenny Richards (eps. 1-3, 5-9, 11-12)
- John Abineri as Hubert Goss (eps. 1, 3, 5-9, 11-12)
- Ian McCulloch as Greg Preston (eps. 2, 10)
- Anna Pitt as Agnes Carlsson (eps. 2-3, 5, 10-11)
- Lorna Lewis as Pet Simpson (eps. 1, 6-7, 10)
- Gordon Salkilld as Jack Wood (eps. 1, 6, 10)
- Edward Underdown as Frank Garner (eps. 7-9)
- William Dysart as Alec Campbell (eps. 8-9, 11-12)
- Stephen Dudley as John Millon (eps. 1, 6, 10)
- Angie Stevens as Lizzie Willoughby (eps. 1, 6, 10)
- Robert Gillespie as Sam Mead (eps. 9, 11-12)
- Barbara Lott as Edith Walter (eps. 3, 5)
- Eric Deacon as Steve Walter (eps. 3, 5)
- Keith Varnier as Owen Walter (eps. 3, 5)
- Cheryl Hall as Mavis (eps. 3, 5)

==== Guest cast ====
- Dan Meaden as Seth (ep. 1)
- June Brown as Susan (ep. 1)
- Michael Hawkins as Colonel Clifford (ep. 1)
- Anthony Jacobs as Geert Miedel (ep. 1)
- John Rolfe as Summers (ep. 1)
- David Freedman as Roberts (ep. 1)
- Sylvia Coleridge as Mrs. Butterworth (ep. 2)
- Joseph McKenna as Eagle (ep. 2)
- Sean Caffrey as Millar (ep. 2)
- Prentis Hancock as McIntosh (ep. 2)
- John Barrard as Mr. Oliver (ep. 2)
- Keith Collins as Bernie (ep. 2)
- Christopher Huxtable as Philip (ep. 2)
- Richard Beaumont as Cliff (ep. 2)
- Johanna Sheffield as Libbie (ep. 2)
- Nicola Glickman as Annie (ep. 2)
- Brian Blessed as Brod (ep. 3)
- Morris Perry as Richard Fenton (ep. 4)
- Bernard Kay as Sanders (ep. 4)
- Ralph Arliss as Jim (ep. 4)
- Max Faulkner as Phil (ep. 4)
- Heather Canning as Ellen (ep. 4)
- Stephen Bill as Ron (ep. 4)
- Eric Francis as Engine Driver (ep. 4)
- Robert Pugh as Terry the Fireman (ep. 4)
- Jane Shaw as Young Girl (ep. 4)
- John Ronane as Bill Sheridan (ep. 5)
- Hazel McBride as Alice (ep. 5)
- Harry Jones as Elphick (ep. 5)
- Rosalind Elliot as Susan (ep. 5)
- John Ruddock as Bagley (ep. 5)
- John Lee as Philip Hurst (ep. 6)
- Jean Gilpin as Janet Millon (ep. 6)
- George Waring as Walter (ep. 6)
- Alan Halley as Henry (ep. 7)
- Paul Seed as Grant (ep. 7)
- Nicolette Roeg as Blossom (ep. 7)
- Heather Emmanuel as Rutna (ep. 7)
- Norman Robbins as Bentley (ep. 7)
- Brian Conley as Michael (ep. 7)
- John Grieve as McLain (ep. 7)
- Derek Martin as Cyril (ep. 7)
- Gabrielle Hamilton as Letty (ep. 8)
- John Bennett as Jim (“Queenie”) (ep. 8)
- Linda Polan as Bet (ep. 8)
- John White as Vic (ep. 8)
- Bryan Pringle as Leonard Woollen (ep. 9)
- Frances Tomelty as Mary-Jean Mead (ep. 9)
- Joe Sumner as Baby (ep. 9)
- Peggy Ann Wood as Mrs. Jay (ep. 9)
- Terence Davies as Harper (ep. 9)
- Martyn Whitby as Grant (ep. 9)
- Clifton Jones as Dr. Stephen Adams (ep. 10)
- George Mallaby as Mason (ep. 10)
- Roy Boyd as Tilley (ep. 10)
- Jon Glover as Dave (ep. 10)
- Richard Cornish as Chris (ep. 10)
- Paul Humpoletz as Powell (ep. 10)
- David Cook as Irvine (ep. 10)
- Roy Marsden as The Captain (ep. 11)
- Frank Vincent as Mitch (ep. 11)
- Gabrielle Daye as Mrs. Hicks (ep. 11)
- John Comer as Les Norton (ep. 11)
- Sean Mathias as Mike (ep. 11)
- Ray Mort as Joe Briggs (ep. 11)
- Denis Holmes as Robert Banks (ep. 11)
- Iain Cuthbertson as McAlister (ep. 12)
- William Armour as Davey (ep. 12)
- Brian Carey as Hamish (ep. 12)
- Barry Stokes as Tom Walter (ep. 12)
- Dorothy Dean as Mrs. Crombie (ep. 12)
- Ray Jeffries as Rob (ep. 12)

==== Episodes ====
#	Title	Directed by	Written by	Designed by	Original airdate
3.01	"Manhunt"	Peter Jefferies	Terence Dudley	Geoff Powell	16 March 1977
Having received a message from Greg, Charles and Jenny go to Greg's last known location. Arriving there, they find a military-run community, which appears hostile. Believing Greg is being held captive, they search for him but are locked up. Jenny escapes and shoots a guard, while Charles learns that it is actually a medical research centre, and the military aspect is a facade to ward off looters. They leave with an agreement to trade food for medicine.
3.02	"A Little Learning"	George Spenton-Foster	Ian McCulloch	Geoff Powel	23 March 1977
Travelling with Agnes, Greg arrives at a community run by children. He discovers the children are being attacked by a disease, which is killing a number of them. He soon discovers that it is caused by the rye bread they are eating, which is infected by a fungus. The children's leader tells Greg they got the rye from two travelling traders. Greg fetches the traders, and the children force the traders to work for them as penance. Nearby, Jenny is searching for Greg, but misses him.
3.03	"Law of the Jungle"	Peter Jefferies	Martin Worth	Geoff Powell	30 March 1977
Charles and Hubert catch up with Jenny, who has been travelling for days. They trio meets up with Agnes, and they take shelter at a community run by a man named Brod. They discover that many community members are there against their will due to Brod's bullying tactics. Brod also forces Charles and the others to stay, promising protection against the wild dogs, which now outnumber people. Brod threatens Charles' life, and to ensure Charles and his group are able to leave safely, Hubert kills Brod, which also allows the other people to return to their farm.
3.04	"Mad Dog"	Tristan de Vere Cole	Don Shaw	Geoff Powell	6 April 1977
Charles meets a man named Richard Fenton, who saves him from a pack of wild dogs. Charles spends the night at Richard's halfway house, but soon realises the man has rabies. After Fenton attacks Charles and the two neighbours from whom Charles has sought help, the neighbours shoot Fenton dead. The men believe Charles also has rabies and try to kill him, too. However, Charles escapes on foot. After being helped by a woman whose house he passes, and then escaping nearly being gunned down again by the men chasing him, Charles eventually escapes by hiding in an old steam train. The train is operational, and a group of people are running it on coal with an eye to setting up a nationwide train service.
3.05	"Bridgehead"	George Spenton-Foster	Martin Worth	Geoff Powell	13 April 1977
Charles returns to the farm, which has been re-settled by Brod's former captives. He meets up with Jenny, Agnes, and Hubert there. Hubert is helping out with the cows, which he believes have brucellosis. Charles and Jenny go in search of a nearby homeopathic specialist. On meeting him, Charles learns that there are a number of people dotted around the nearby areas, and he is keen to have them all meet once a week to trade their various wares. He arranges a meeting at the train station, at which various people reveal they are producing beef, chicken, pork, cheese, and honey, which they agree to trade with each other.
3.06	"Reunion"	Terence Dudley	Don Shaw	Geoff Powell	20 April 1977
Upon arriving at the house of one of Hubert's friends, Hubert, Jenny, and Charles discover the man has broken his leg. The man directs them to take him to the house of a nearby veterinarian, named Janet. Charles talks to her and her partner about their lives there, which are very comfortable, and decides that his community could move here, where there are more facilities and people nearby. To Jenny's surprise, she discovers that John, the boy she has been looking after, is Janet's son. The mother and son are reunited for the first time in two years.
3.07	"The Peacemaker"	George Spenton-Foster	Roger Parkes	Geoff Powell	27 April 1977
Charles, Jenny, and Hubert arrive at a religious settlement, where no violence or guns are allowed. They stay there for the night and discover the settlement has a fully functional windmill, which they allow local people to use in trade. One of the settlement's leaders, Frank, asks to go with Charles, Jenny, and Hubert, as he is fitted with a pacemaker, which is nearing the end of its life. They leave in search of a power station engineer, who is reportedly nearby.
3.08	"Sparks"	Tristan de Vere Cole	Roger Parkes	Geoff Powell	4 May 1977
In search of the power station specialist, Alec, the group arrives at his settlement. He is extremely hostile, however, and claims to have no more interest in his former career. However, the group discovers that Alec is haunted by the memory of his dead wife. They encourage him to face his fears, which brings him to a breaking point. He attempts suicide but is saved by Charles. Coming to his senses, Alec agrees to help and goes with them.
3.09	"The Enemy"	Peter Jefferies	Roger Parkes	Geoff Powell	11 May 1977
The travellers arrive at a large community, which has its own brewery and mine. They stay the night due to Frank's now weakened condition. Charles is unsure of Alec's willingness to work with them, and during a night of heavy drinking tries to persuade Jenny to sleep with Alec. She is furious, but Alec has decided to stay anyway and helps the men work on their generator. Another man, Sam, opposes turning the electricity back on and is determined to stop them. With Frank now dead, the others move on, accompanied by Sam.
3.10	"The Last Laugh"	Peter Jefferies	Ian McCulloch	Geoff Powell	18 May 1977
In his travels, Greg meets a group of men who gain his confidence as he talks about his trip to Norway. They seize his map, notes, boots, clothes, and horse, however, and leave him for dead. On realising the notes and map notations are written in Norwegian, the men go to the community to capture Agnes, to translate for them. Greg makes it to a nearby settlement, where he meets a doctor who is dying of smallpox. Greg contracts the disease but summons the strength to rescue the community from the bandits by appearing to join the brigands. He says goodbye and informs Agnes in Norwegian that he is dying, before moving off with the brigands – intentionally infecting them all.
3.11	"Long Live the King"	Tristan de Vere Cole	Martin Worth	Geoff Powell	1 June 1977
Charles gets an urgent message to meet Greg. Arriving at an old army camp, Charles discovers that credit notes bearing Greg's name are being issued in return for petrol. Agnes tells Charles that they have a million gallons stored there. Jenny arrives and inquires about Greg's whereabouts. Agnes reveals that he is dead, and that they don't have the petrol they claim. The intention, however, is to set up a government enforcing proper law and order. Initially reluctant, Charles comes round to the idea after the camp is infiltrated by two bandits, and the group locks up the bandits rather than shooting them.
3.12	"Power"	George Spenton-Foster	Martin Worth	Geoff Powell	8 June 1977
Travelling to a hydro-electric power station in Scotland, Charles, Jenny, and Hubert meet a local laird, who tells them that in the Highlands more than 150,000 people have survived the plague, making it the most densely populated part of Britain. Charles informs him that they are there to switch the electricity back on, which Alec and Sam are now working on. At the power station, Alec is making preparations, but Sam is sabotaging Alec's work. The others arrive there to find Alec unconscious, while Sam has disappeared, intent on wrecking the whole system. During a struggle, Sam is killed. Before the supply is restored, the Laird argues with Charles that the power belongs to Scotland, but Alec insists that he is the only one able to switch it back on. After they reach an agreement that Alec will control the supply, Alec switches it on.

=== Audio drama episodes ===
==== Series 1 (2014) ====
"Revelation" and "Exodus" depict events happening in parallel with the early episodes of the first TV series, as the Death first takes hold and wipes out much of the UK's population. "Judges" and "Esther" take place after the Grange's cellar storeroom is flooded ("Something of Value").

No.	Title	Directed by	Written by	Released
1	"Revelation"	Ken Bentley	Matt Fitton	June 2014
When people begin to die of a new strain of a flu virus, newspaper journalists Helen Wiseman and Daniel Connor investigate. They uncover a terrifying story - but will anyone ever get to read it?
2	"Exodus"	Ken Bentley	Jonathan Morris	June 2014
Billions of people have died across the globe. Cities are rife with secondary diseases, and the survivors attempt to make their way out of London.
3	"Judges"	Ken Bentley	Andrew Smith	June 2014
After a storm wipes out much of their community's supplies, Greg and Jenny go in search of new provisions - much to Abby's disapproval.
4	"Esther"	Ken Bentley	John Dorney	June 2014
Greg, Jenny and their new friends are trapped. Will they ever make it out alive?

==== Series 2 (2015) ====
Events in this box-set take place between Series 1 and Series 2 of the TV series.

No.	Title	Directed by	Written by	Released
1	"Dark Rain"	Ken Bentley	Ken Bentley	June 2015
Months after the plague, storms batter the country. As Abby resumes the search for her son, Jackie and Daniel fight for their lives.
2	"Mother's Courage"	Ken Bentley	Louise Jameson	June 2015
The search for Peter leads to Aberystwyth and a community of women who have cut themselves off from the outside world. But what appears to be a safe haven could be nothing of the sort...
3	"The Hunted"	Ken Bentley	Ken Bentley	June 2015
Greg, Daniel and Russell need the help of survivalist Irvin Warner, who is hiding out in the Brecon Beacons. But predators are roaming in the barren countryside too...
4	"Savages"	Ken Bentley	Matt Fitton	June 2015
Wounded, split apart and fighting for their lives, the survivors discover that survival isn't everything...

==== Series 3 (2015) ====
Events in this box-set take place between Series 1 and Series 2 of the TV series.

No.	Title	Directed by	Written by	Released
1	"Cabin Fever"	Ken Bentley	Jonathan Morris	November 2015
After weeks of searching for her son across a devastated Britain, Abby Grant and her allies head into London in pursuit of new leads. One of the party is quarantined, holed up with a fever. They remember the very first days of the Death, and the actions of a man called John Vincent...
2	"Contact"	Ken Bentley	Simon Clark	November 2015
A lonely voice on the radio calls out across the ether. Maddie Price is a long way from home, but not yet ready to give up hope.
3	"Rescue"	Ken Bentley	Andrew Smith	November 2015
When his friends' lives hang in the balance hundreds of feet above London, Jimmy Garland leads a daring rescue mission into the capital.
4	"Leaving"	Ken Bentley	Matt Fitton	November 2015
Down on the coast, plans are being made to reach out across the world. It could mean a new beginning for some, and the long-awaited chance to return home for others.

==== Series 4 (2016) ====
Events in this box-set take place between the episodes of the second TV series.

No.	Title	Directed by	Written by	Released
1	"The Old Ways"	Ken Bentley	Ken Bentley	June 2016
The Government has plans for a national state of emergency. But when Evelyn Piper and her colleagues shelter in the Tartarus bunker, they discover no amount of planning can prepare for the reality of the Death...
2	"For the Good of the Cause"	Ken Bentley	Louise Jameson	June 2016
One old friend calls on Greg and Jenny to look after another. Together, they visit a utopian community where the inspirational Theo seems to have founded the perfect way of life...
3	"Collision"	Ken Bentley	Christopher Hatherall	June 2016
When the old world collides with the new, casualties are unavoidable. While Greg and Theo work together for the future, Jenny tries to save lives - with the help of a troubled young man called Michael...
4	"Forgive and Forget"	Ken Bentley	Matt Fitton	June 2016
As long-buried crimes surface, resentment and recrimination threaten to destroy the peace of the Foundation. Jenny, Jackie and Molly have their own trials to bear, and Greg confronts the truth of this new world head on. For some, nothing will ever be the same…

==== Series 5 (2016) ====
Events in this box-set happen between the episodes of the second TV series.

No.	Title	Directed by	Written by	Released
1	"The Second Coming"	Ken Bentley	Andrew Smith	November 2016
Millions died when the plague swept the globe. Such a thing couldn’t possibly happen again - or could it? When Abby Grant and Evelyn Piper both arrive at Carol Baker’s Maythorne community, a chain of events is set in motion that could unleash a new wave of death across the country.
2	"New Blood"	Ken Bentley	Christopher Hatherall	November 2016
Danger surrounds Whitecross when a simple border dispute exposes deadly tensions between those who live side by side. Greg Preston and Jenny Richards soon find themselves fighting for their lives, as people in the grip of a terrible new fear turn to the old ways to protect themselves...
3	"Angel of Death"	Ken Bentley	Simon Clark	November 2016
Emerging from a quarantined Whitecross, Greg and Jenny discover that the danger they glimpsed at Springton is far from over. Meanwhile, as isolated communities find themselves exposed to a disease they know nothing about, Abby joins a desperate race to save lives.
4	"Come the Horsemen"	Ken Bentley	Andrew Smith	November 2016
In times of crisis, rumour and fear run rife across the decimated landscape of Britain. Evelyn and Abby experience the lethal effects of this panic first hand. At such times the worst of humanity is exposed. Can Greg and Jenny find the best in those around them? Or is there no way to avoid the coming of the horsemen?

==== Series 6 (2017) ====
Events in this box-set happen between the second and third TV series and in parallel with early episodes of the third.

No.	Title	Directed by	Written by	Released
1	"Beating the Bounds"	Ken Bentley	Ian Potter	June 2017
Abby Grant’s search for her son has taken her all across Britain and back. Following every possible lead, she finds herself on long-abandoned roads to forgotten villages. But now, two years after the first Death, such communities still wish to protect themselves. And they do not take kindly to strangers.
2	"The Trapping Pit"	Ken Bentley	Christopher Hatherall	June 2017
On a routine trading mission from Whitecross to Evelyn Piper’s Foundation, Jenny Richards and community doctor Ruth Anderson are ambushed by desperate scavengers. When the tables turn, an escape attempt becomes a struggle for survival. With a young man’s life hanging in the balance, Ruth’s skills are put to the ultimate test.
3	"Revenge of Heaven"	Ken Bentley	Simon Clark	June 2017
Greg Preston has forged links with survivors in Norway to start rebuilding society. He’s ready to return home to his family… until an unexpected visitor drags him into a race across the Scandinavian snows. Hope for the future lies with a kidnapped scientist, and some will go to any lengths to control that hope.
4	"Lockup"	Ken Bentley	Andrew Smith	June 2017
As her journey continues, Abby encounters a secure and well-ordered community, based inside a prison complex, calling itself ‘Peacetown’. But the settlement is not as idyllic as its name suggests, and the lockup harbours secrets. Among them, a prisoner. Someone Abby knows of old... A man called Greg Preston.

==== Series 7 (2017) ====
Events in this box-set happen after the end of the third TV series.

No.	Title	Directed by	Written by	Released
1	"Journey's End"	Ken Bentley	Roland Moore	November 2017
Alone and resolute, a mother has spent the years since the Death searching for her son. She is closing in on her final lead. One last hope to find Peter. But for Abby Grant, the worst possible thing might be to find what she is looking for…
2	"Legacy"	Ken Bentley	Simon Clark	November 2017
Greg Preston is dead. But the work he did in forging his foundation, in bringing communities together, lives on. When she and Ruth encounter those whose lives he touched, Jenny Richards is forced to remember how the man she loved abandoned her. But when she meets a common enemy, can she find the strength to make a stand?
3	"Old Friends"	Ken Bentley	Matt Fitton	November 2017
Ruth Anderson and Evelyn Piper unite on a mission of mercy. An old friend is in trouble and in the path of dangerous forces. Jackie Burchell could reveal secrets that change lives. But first, she must find her own way back. When things are at their worst, it is old friends who keep you going.
4	"Reconnection"	Ken Bentley	Christopher Hatherall	November 2017
As Jenny continues her plan to restore electricity across the country, she meets someone she never thought she would see again – but it is a very different Abby Grant to the one who left the Grange. Not everyone is in favour of Jenny’s project, and the women find danger in a remote power station. It may be too late for them to reconnect…

==== Series 8 (2018) ====
Events in this box-set happen after the end of the third TV series.

No.	Title	Directed by	Written by	Released
1	"Bandit Train"	Ken Bentley	Christopher Hatherall	November 2018
Society is slowly rebuilding. Abby and Jenny are transporting supplies between settlements. Craig is learning how to run the steam engines on lines cleared by Greg Preston. But there are still those who just want to take. And their train is about to come under attack…
2	"Robert"	Ken Bentley	Jane Slavin	November 2018
Once, Robert Malcolm had a complicated life. His wife in an institution, his girlfriend running a struggling business, he was out of the army and without a place in the world. When the Death came, it meant many things to many people. For Robert, it meant freedom.
3	"The Lost Boys"	Ken Bentley	Lisa McMullin	November 2018
Peter Grant is alive. He is with Robert Malcolm’s army of boy soldiers, learning to survive. Building a better future. But medic Ruth has her suspicions when she visits the camp. And Craig is about to find out what it takes to become a recruit.
4	"Village of Dust"	Ken Bentley	Roland Moore	November 2018
Abby, still desperate for the reunion she’s been seeking for years, now knows that Peter is part of an army. Meanwhile, Jenny realises that someone is drawing plans against her budding Federation. A war is coming, and mother and son are on different sides.

==== Series 9 (2019) ====
No.	Title	Directed by	Written by	Released
1	"The Farm"	Ken Bentley	Jane Slavin	June 2019
After a short, sharp coup, power has shifted and a new order asserts control over the country. Meg Pritchard believes she is the leader who can draw together the threads of civilisation. With the men sent to war, Jenny must help the women of ‘The Farm’ see the truth behind their new society.
2	"Hearts and Mines"	Ken Bentley	Christopher Hatherall	June 2019
The Protectorate now holds resources once shared by the Federation. Its enemies are branded terrorists, as they skirmish up and down the country. Craig wants to strike a decisive blow, while Abby still hopes for reconciliation with her son. Ruth is caught between her friends: can she stop them both from making terrible mistakes?
3	"Fade Out"	Ken Bentley	Roland Moore	June 2019
Robert Malcolm is closing in on the ringleaders still struggling against the Protectorate. Peter Grant has reasons to make this fight personal. But the fugitives, hiding in an abandoned cinema, find that people are tired of war. When the soldiers come to town, for some, this will be their last stand.
4	"Conflict"	Ken Bentley	Andrew Smith	June 2019
The Protectorate tightens its grip on the fragile infrastructure of a country in recovery. All stirrings of rebellion must be crushed. But Jenny has a plan to unseat its leaders once and for all. And now she, Abby and Peter Grant are heading inexorably towards a final confrontation.

==== Series 10: New Dawn (2021–23) ====
No.	Title	Directed by	Written by	Released
Volume 1
1	"Tethered"	Ken Bentley	Andrew Smith	November 2021
Abby Grant is heading home on a tragic mission when she meets an apparent Good Samaritan, who may be nothing of the sort. And in Cambridge, the seat of the New Federal Government, the Prime Minister tasks Law Minister Jenny Richards with a secret assignment. Both women soon find themselves in deadly peril.
2	"My Generation"	Ken Bentley	Katharine Armitage	November 2021
Abby is on the run, and Jenny risks her future to protect her. An old friend, Jackie Burchall, is also eager to help. But when Abby falls in with an activist group called The Veil, it jeopardises everyone.
3	"Behind You"	Ken Bentley	Roland Moore	November 2021
Abby remembers Leonard Cross as the awful children’s entertainer who came to one of her son’s birthday parties before the Death. She doesn’t expect to find herself relying on him as she recovers from injury and tragedy. And he may be even more awful than she knows...
Volume 2
1	"Bad Blood"	Ken Bentley	Lizbeth Myles	February 2022
Abby and Jenny are heading north when they’re thrown into the middle of a conflict between two rival factions. Learning someone has tried to assassinate the local Governor, is there anything they can do to prevent further violence and bloodshed?
2	"What First We Practise to Deceive"	Ken Bentley	Andrew Smith	February 2022
Abby and Jenny reach the Zone controlled by Governor Dominic Crayle. He has serious questions to answer, but Crayle will go to any lengths to protect his secrets.
3	"Last Stand"	Ken Bentley	Roland Moore	February 2022
In the overgrown remains of an abandoned city, a new friend helps Abby and Jenny make a last stand against a determined enemy.
Volume 3
1	"The Turning, Part 1"	Ken Bentley	Ken Bentley	April 2023
Caught between an increasingly authoritarian Prime Minister and activists determined to bring down the New Federal Government, Jenny struggles to prevent the collapse of everything they’ve worked so hard to build.
2	"The Turning, Part 2"	Ken Bentley	Ken Bentley	April 2023
Answering her friend's desperate call for help, Abby returns to find Cambridge in chaos, and Jenny is surrounded by danger and betrayal as a new regime desperately try to restore order.
3	"Samaritans"	Ken Bentley	Ken Bentley	April 2023
Escaping Cambridge, Abby and Jenny save the life of an elderly man they find living alone in the woods and gratefully accept his offer of warmth and shelter. But as the cold and dark close in it is not only the animals that come out at night...
Volume 4
1	"Albion"	Ken Bentley	Ken Bentley	September 2023
Continuing their journey south, Abby and Jenny venture for the first time to Kent. There they find a strange new world where the mistakes of the past are being repeated in the present, and where life is hard for those without the skills to survive.
2	"Fallout"	Ken Bentley	Matt Fitton	September 2023
With Jenny taken by an unknown enemy, Abby sets out on a desperate search. Her journey leads into dangerous territory. An old friend is on hand to help, but Ruth has worries of her own. Together, Ruth and Abby look into the mystery of sickness around Dungeness. Will they find Jenny before it is too late?
3	"Requiem"	Ken Bentley	Ken Bentley	September 2023
Abby and Ruth finally come face to face with the strange and elusive people of Kent. They soon find themselves on the wrong side of a bitter conflict which forces them to question everything they thought they knew about life in the new world.

== Critical Reception ==
The science fiction historian John Clute lauded the first season of Survivors, calling it "restrained, almost somber" and placing it "among the finest televised SF". However, Clute was dismissive of the show's other seasons, arguing that the show then "descended towards postholocaust soap opera."

== Books ==
Five novels related to series one have been published:

- Nation, Terry (1975). Survivors. An adaptation of certain of his own series one episodes, with a radically different ending
- Eyers, John (1977). Genesis of a Hero. A direct sequel to Nation's book; it bears no relation to events in series two and three
- Eyers, John (2021). Salvation. A follow-up to Eyers' previous novel, continuing in the Terry Nation timeline
- Milsea, Ethan (2021). Ghosts and Demons. A new standalone story set during the latter half of series one
- Sutherland, Doris (2022). Crusade. A new standalone story set during the latter half of series one

Three factual books about the series have been published:

- Marshall, Kevin P, ed. (1995). The Making of Terry Nation's Survivors. Fourth Horseman Publications.
- Cross, Rich; Priestner, Andy (December 2005). The End of the World? The Unofficial and Unauthorised Guide to Survivors. Telos Publishing Ltd. ISBN 978-1845830014.
- Cross, Rich (April 2026). Survivors: The classic post-apocalyptic BBC series / Series one / 1975. Inky Hand Press. ISBN 978-1919386300.

== Home releases ==
Each of the three series of Survivors were originally released on DVD annually from 2003–2005 by DD Home Entertainment. Each series set included a colour booklet written and researched by Survivors fan Andy Priestner chronicling the making of each series, plus the following extra features:

#	DVD release date	Special features
Series One	6 October 2003	Audio commentary on episode The Fourth Horseman recorded on 5 June 2003, with Carolyn Seymour (Abby Grant) and Pennant Roberts (director). Moderator: Andy Priestner.; Audio commentary on episode Law and Order recorded on 5 June 2003, with Ian McCulloch (Greg Preston) and Lucy Fleming (Jenny Richards). Moderator: Andy Priestner.; On-camera interviews with Pennant Roberts, Carolyn Seymour, Ian McCulloch, Lucy Fleming and Tanya Ronder (Lizzie Willoughby). All on-camera interviews recorded on 5 June 2003.; "On Location" mute footage – a 75 second mute film of certain behind the scenes happenings during the recording of the Series 1 episode A Beginning.; Photo gallery – A collection of BBC photos from Series 1.; Lucy Fleming's photo collection – Lucy Fleming's photos taken during the making of Series 1.
Series Two	4 October 2004	Audio commentary on episode Lights of London – Part 2 recorded on 3 June 2004, with Denis Lill (Charles Vaughan) and Pennant Roberts (director). Moderator: Rich Cross.; On-camera interviews with Pennant Roberts, Denis Lill, Lorna Lewis (Pet Simpson) and Heather Wright (Melanie). All on-camera interviews recorded on 3 June 2004.; Photo gallery – A collection of BBC photos from Series 2.
Series Three	14 November 2005	Audio commentary on episode Law of the Jungle recorded on 4 August 2005, with Lucy Fleming (Jenny Richards) and Peter Jefferies (director). Moderator: Andy Priestner.; Audio commentary on episode Mad Dog recorded on 4 August 2005, with Morris Perry (Richard Fenton) and Tristan de Vere Cole (director). Moderator: Rich Cross.; "New World Rising" – documentary on the making of Series 3 produced by Andy Priestner with contributions from directors Peter Jefferies and Tristan DeVere Cole and actors Lucy Fleming and Stephen Dudley (John Millon). All interviews in the documentary recorded on 4 August 2005.; Photo gallery – A collection of BBC photos from the Series 3 episode Manhunt.; Denis Lill's photo collection – Denis Lill's photos taken during the making of Series 2 and Series 3.

On 24 November 2008, the BBC company 2 Entertain released all three series of Survivors together in a boxset, with the BBC4 documentary The Cult of Survivors from 2006 included as an extra. Also included on the 2008 DVD boxset were English language subtitles for the hard-of-hearing, which were not included on previous DVD releases. However, the audio commentaries, on-camera interviews, Denis Lill's photo collection and New World Rising documentary from previous DVD releases were not included on the 2008 DVD boxset.

== See also ==
- Jeremiah (TV series), another post-plague series, set 15 years after a plague killed off the adults, with similarities to both The Tribe and Survivors
- The Tribe, a 1999 post-plague series focusing on teenagers, right after a plague kills off all adults
- Jericho (2006 TV series), a post-nuclear holocaust series
- The Changes (TV series), a 1975 series set in a Britain that is suddenly plunged into a pre-industrial age
- The Last Train (TV series), a 1999 series following a group of train passengers who survive an apocalyptic meteor strike
- The Stand (1994 miniseries), a post-plague television series set in the United States, based on Stephen King's 1978 novel of the same name
