= Celia Gregory =

British actress (1949–2008)

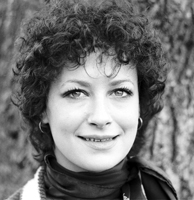
- Celia Gregory (1973)
- Born: 23 September 1949; United Kingdom
- Died: 8 September 2008 (aged 58)
- Occupation: Actress

Celia Christine Gregory (23 September 1949 – 8 September 2008) was a British stage, film and television actress, who became a faith healer later in life.

Best known for her role as Ruth Anderson in the 1976 BBC television drama Survivors, she also appeared in such television series as Hammer House of Horror, The Professionals, Bergerac, Tales of the Unexpected, The Case-Book of Sherlock Holmes: The Problem of Thor Bridge and Reilly, Ace of Spies, among many others.

She also worked as a stage actress in London's West End opposite Laurence Olivier, Joan Plowright and Frank Finlay in 1973 in Eduardo De Filippo's play, Saturday, Sunday, Monday. In 1991, she played Calphurnia in Julius Caesar and Lady Capulet in Romeo and Juliet for the Royal Shakespeare Company.

She married Keith Bender and they had two sons. The marriage ended in divorce. She retired in 1993 to spend time with her family. Celia Gregory died in 2008, aged 58, from undisclosed causes.

== Filmography ==
=== Film ===
Year	Title	Role	Notes
1979	Agatha	Nancy Neele	
1984	The Inside Man	Theresa	
1993	The Baby of Mâcon	The Mother Superior	(final film role)

=== Television ===
Year	Title	Role	Notes
1972	Thirty-Minute Theatre	The Woman in the Forest	Episode: "That Quiet Earth"
1975	Quiller	Myrianthe	Episode: "Mark the File Expendable"
1976	Survivors	Ruth	Series 2; 11 episodes
1977	Kilvert's Diary	Margaret Oswald	Episode: "Junkettings"
1978	Saturday Sunday Monday	Guilianella	Television film
1978	Hazell	Vinnie Rae	3 episodes
1978	The Sunday Drama	Princess Borodski	Episode: "The Marrying Kind"
1979	The Dancing Years	Maria Ziegler	Television film
1980	Hammer House of Horror	Sarah	Episode: "Children of the Full Moon"
1980	The Professionals	Inger North	Episode: "The Gun"
1981	Tales of the Unexpected	Fatima	Episode: "Kindly Dig Your Grave"
1982	The Last Visitor	Emily Otway	Television film
1982	Play for Today	Frances	Episode: "Soft Targets"
1983	Reilly, Ace of Spies	Nadia Massino	Mini-series; 3 episodes
1983	Bergerac	Liz Phillips	Episode: "A Hole in the Bucket"
1984	Lace	Queen Serah	Mini-series; 2 episodes
1984	Tales of the Unexpected	Edna	Episode: "The Last of the Midnight Gardeners"
1985	Lace II	Queen Serah	Mini-series; 2 episodes
1986	Casualty	Anne	Episode: "No Future"
1989	The Ruth Rendell Mysteries	Gemma Lawrence	Episodes: "No More Dying Then: Parts 1–3"
1990	The Paradise Club	Maggie Deverell	Episode: "Faces from the Past"
1991	The Case-Book of Sherlock Holmes	Maria Gibson	Episode: "The Problem of Thor Bridge"
