= Chris Tranchell =

British actor (born 1941)

- Born: Christopher Peter John Small; 13 April 1941 (age 84); Ringwood, Hampshire, England
- Occupation: Actor

Chris Tranchell (born Christopher Peter John Small, 13 April 1941) is a British actor, best known for his role in the television drama Survivors as Paul Pitman. It was in one of these episodes (Law and Order) where he played the guitar and led the group in a rendition of the Buddy Holly song It Doesn't Matter Anymore which led to him becoming a presenter of children's programme Play School from 1976–1984.

== Early life ==
Changing his surname from Small to Tranchell (due to being under six feet tall and finding it unpleasant being called "Small" at school), he began his training at the Sander Theatre School in Southampton, wanting to become an actor. At 16, he passed an audition for the Bristol Old Vic Theatre School, wanting to go there since it offered classical grounding. Two years later, he walked into the Grand Theatre, Southampton to ask Hector Ross for a job and successfully got one.

== Career ==
Tranchell appeared in three different Doctor Who serials: The Massacre of St Bartholomew's Eve in 1966, The Faceless Ones in 1967 and The Invasion of Time in 1978. His other credits include Z-Cars, The Onedin Line, The New Avengers, The Bill and Casualty. Theatre work includes Thomas Malory’s Morte D'Arthur at the Lyric Hammersmith in the roles of Merlin and Pelles.

== Personal life ==
While performing in Margate in 1962, Tranchell met the actress Louanne Harvey. The following year, they were married and together they had three children. Over the next decade, the couple appeared in repertories such as Plymouth, Bellingham and Worcester during which she transferred from acting to designing sets and costumes. While based at the Swan Theatre in 1973, the family became homeless after the lease on their lodgings ran out and as a result, spent 13 nights sleeping in a tent on the lawn at the home of then-theatre owner John Hole. Eventually, they were offered a flat for four weeks by Worcester Public Services Committee with the rent being paid by the theatre.

Louanne would later become a planning activist and campaigner, attending protests such as Cop 21 in Paris. She died in 2025.

== Filmography ==
- Battle of Britain (1969) - 'A' Station Pilot (uncredited)
