= Michael Hawkins (British actor) =

British actor (1928–2014)

- Born: Stanley Michael Hawkins; 26 November 1928; Blean, Kent, England
- Died: 26 October 2014 (aged 85); Swindon, Wiltshire, England
- Occupation: Actor
- Years active: 1957–1980
- Spouse: Winifred Jean Usher (m. 1951)

Stanley Michael Hawkins (26 November 1928 – 26 October 2014) was a British actor. Though rarely the star in any series or film in which he appeared, Hawkins appeared in supporting roles in dozens of productions over three decades.

His credits included parts in The Avengers, I, Claudius, George and Mildred, Doomwatch, The Brothers and the Doctor Who story Frontier in Space.

Hawkins retired in 1980, and died on 26 October 2014, aged 85.

== Filmography ==
Year	Title	Role	Notes
1959	The Hound of the Baskervilles	Lord Caphill	
1960	Dentist in the Chair	Brown	
1961	The Terror of the Tongs	Priest at Anna's House	Uncredited
1967	They Came from Beyond Space	Williams	
1967	Torture Garden	Constable	Uncredited
1968	Decline and Fall... of a Birdwatcher	Stubbs	
1973	Doctor Who	General Williams	Serial Frontier in Space
1974	Who Killed Lamb?	Bardon	Television film
1974	11 Harrowhouse	Patient	
