= The Doombolt Chase =

1978 British TV series

- Written by: Don Houghton
- Directed by: Robert Fuest; Peter Graham Scott
- Starring: Peter Vaughan; Frederick Jaeger; Donald Burton; Ewen Solon; Andrew Ashby; Shelley Crowhurst; Richard Willis; George Coulouris; John Woodnutt; Simon MacCorkindale
- Theme music composer: Eve King
- Country of origin: United Kingdom
- Original language: English
- No. of series: 1
- No. of episodes: 6

Production
- Executive producer: Patrick Dromgoole
- Producer: Peter Graham Scott
- Running time: 30 minutes (per episode)
- Production company: HTV

Original release
- Network: ITV
- Release: 12 March – 16 April 1978

The Doombolt Chase is a naval-themed British science fiction/action television series aimed at a teenage audience. It was broadcast between 12 March and 16 April 1978, as a six-episode series. It was also broadcast in Canada on TVOntario in 1978 and in Germany in 1979 under the title Geheimprojekt Doombolt ("Secret Project Doombolt").

== Plot summary ==
During a night-time patrol in the Bristol Channel, naval Commander David Wheeler (Donald Burton) receives a message encrypted in Spens Code, a code unknown to the Navy operators. Soon afterwards, Wheeler orders the ship to go about and deliberately rams a small fishing vessel, sinking it completely. He is immediately court-martialled, but he offers no explanations for his actions – neither to his defending counsel and friend, Commander Jeffrey Vallance (Frederick Jaeger), nor to his only son, Richard (Andrew Ashby).

Richard decides to investigate the matter with his friends Lucy (Shelley Crowhurst) and Pete (Richard Willis), a junior seaman who had witnessed the incident first-hand. Richard happens to know about the Spens Code and its creator: a former Naval Intelligence operative named Hugh Spencer (John Woodnutt), a friend of his father's, who lives in Braxtet. The trio immediately set out in Wheeler's sailing yacht, relentlessly dogged by the Navy watchdogs assigned to watch over Richard. In order to cut time, they sail through the Navy's Forbidden Zone in the Channel, where they encounter a boat with radio-controlled operations and a strange set of aerials mounted on top.

Finally arriving at Spencer's house, they find him missing and signs of a struggle. Piecing together the few clues left to them, they stumble upon the word "Doombolt" and a map overlay of the Bristol Channel area which has several points marked. One of these is a manor named Scudmore, where the youths suspect Spencer has been brought to. Arriving there, they find the place heavily guarded and its occupants marching around in strange silver suits and helmets, which turn out to be protective gear against ultrasonics. They also come to witness a demonstration of a new superweapon, directed by a man called Doctor Franz Bayard (George Coulouris).

The Doombolt is a top secret advanced missile guidance system designed by the Royal Navy. It consists of a concentrated radio beam which is meant to guide a missile unerringly to its target; by use of a special, inconspicuous sonar emission vessel, defence missiles buried in the sea bed around the British main isle are fired into the air, where the Doombolt beam takes over. However, the Navy's design was faulty, burning out the transmission beacons and subsequently causing the self-destruction of the missiles. Bayard, a former Navy scientist, has perfected the system by basing it on a two-beam transmission, collected and amplified at a central control station; but he intends to sell it to a foreign power for his own profit. For a demonstration, he intends to target the Fiddich Brae, a new nuclear-powered supertanker. Commander Wheeler's actions were motivated by the need to prevent Bayard from taking over the Navy's sonar trigger vessel (the sunken vessel), which, however, has already been replaced by the mystery boat in the Forbidden Zone. Only a few officers, including Wheeler and his superior Captain Hatfield (Peter Vaughan), are privy to the project, but there is suspicion of a mole inside the Navy's Doombolt project. Hugh Spencer, who sent the distress message to Wheeler, worked as an undercover spy against Bayard until he was discovered and captured.

Richard, Lucy and Pete try to inform Navy HQ in Bristol, where they run into Vallance, who offers to take them to the CEO's cottage in the Brecon Beacons. During the ride Vallance lets slip some clues that reveal that he is Bayard's mole in the Navy Doombolt project. Richard and his friends flee immediately, with Vallance and Bayard's men, who are about to set up the first transmission beacon in the area, in pursuit. Distraught at learning that his son has been nearby and is now in danger, Commander Wheeler asks Hatfield for permission to find his son by himself.

In the Beacons, Wheeler stumbles upon Bayard's operation and briefly frees Spencer before they are both recaptured, and after a long chase through the area Richard, Lucy and Pete are also caught. As the captives compare notes while the second beacon is transported to its destination (the Mendips, also called "Devil’s Jaws"), they learn the transmission angles for the beacons. Also, the youths have left some clues about what they have learned about the Doombolt project, but even with this information the Navy is helpless: since the beacons are small, locating them in these extensive areas proves impossible, and Bayard has taken steps to ensure that the Fiddich Brae remains ignorant to the danger.

After the second beacon is set, Bayard intends to have his captives brought to his central control as hostages. But as they are to be taken away, Lucy slips out of her bonds and flees. After a long, desperate run, she manages to contact Naval Headquarters and provide Hatfield with the necessary information to track down the Doombolt control centre: Cragfest Island, in the middle of the Channel. A company of Royal Marines is dispatched immediately to take down Bayard's Doombolt.

Meanwhile, on Cragfest, Bayard receives his "guests", gloating about his achievements in working on the Doombolt and about the impending demonstration. The final sequence is initiated when the Marines attack the island. Pete frees himself and Commander Wheeler from their bonds, and with only seconds left, they attack Bayard and Vallance. Bayard fires at Wheeler with his pistol, but hits the Doombolt controls instead, critically damaging the system. Just before central control self-destructs, Bayard and Vallance manage to escape in a mini submarine.

The series ends with the beginning of a sailing tour on Commander Wheeler's yacht, where Pete's reservations about having a woman on board seem justified when Lucy inadvertently causes him to land in the bay.

== Cast ==
- Peter Vaughan as Captain Hatfield
- Frederick Jaeger as Commander Jeffrey Vallance
- Donald Burton as Commander David Wheeler
- Ewen Solon as Admiral Lupin
- Andrew Ashby as Richard Wheeler
- Shelley Crowhurst as Lucy
- Richard Willis as Peter
- George Coulouris as Franz Bayard
- John Woodnutt as Hugh Spencer
- Howard Goorney as Garble
- Simon MacCorkindale as Lt. Commander Maddox
- Gordon Salkilld as Petty Officer Parker

== Episodes ==
No.	Title	Directed by	Written by	Original release date
1	"Court of Shame"	Robert Fuest	Don Houghton	12 March 1978
2	"Escape to Danger"	Robert Fuest	Don Houghton	19 March 1978
3	"Death Beacon"	Peter Graham Scott	Don Houghton	26 March 1978
4	"Alarm at Gareth's Peak"	Robert Fuest	Don Houghton	2 April 1978
5	"The Devil's Jaws"	Robert Fuest	Don Houghton	9 April 1978
6	"Assault on Cragfest"	Peter Graham Scott	Don Houghton	16 April 1978

== Filming locations ==
Exterior scenes for the villains' base on Cragfest Island were shot at Brean Down Fort, Somerset, a National Trust property.

== Adaptations ==
The series was broadcast in 1979 under the title "Geheimprojekt Doombolt" in Germany by the ARD.

== Reception ==
The series has become a nearly-forgotten feature in television history, although it was commented on in several recent reviews as being more enjoyable than other, supernaturally themed HTV productions, such as Children of the Stones and King of the Castle.

== DVD releases ==
In December 2009, the series was released on DVD in the United Kingdom.
