= Scorpion Tales =

1978 British television thriller series

- Genre: Thriller
- Directed by: David Reid, Don Leaver, Shaun O'Riordan, John Bruce
- Theme music composer: Cyril Ornadel
- Country of origin: United Kingdom
- Original language: English
- No. of series: 1
- No. of episodes: 6

Production
- Producer: David Reid
- Camera setup: Multi-camera
- Running time: c. 50 minutes per episode

Original release
- Network: ATV
- Release: 29 April – 12 August 1978

Scorpion Tales is a British thriller television series, originally screened in 1978. Produced by ATV, the series was transmitted on the ITV network. It lasted just one season.

== Overview ==
The series comprised one-off hour-long plays, which featured a twist-ending. The format was similar in genre to the Thriller series, which had run successfully during the early to mid-1970s. The series was produced by David Reid who would go on to oversee similarly-themed series such as Sapphire & Steel and Hammer House of Horror. Reid also directed three of the stories, with Don Leaver, Shaun O'Riordan and John Bruce directing the others. The stories were written by experienced television scriptwriters such as Ian Kennedy Martin (The Sweeney), Jeremy Burnham (The Avengers), and Bob Baker and Dave Martin (Doctor Who). The opening credits featured a title sequence by Alastair McMunro depicting two scorpions fighting on a black background, with a theme by Cyril Ornadel. Among the guest casts were noted actors Trevor Howard, Don Henderson, Geoffrey Palmer, Susan Engel, Christopher Benjamin and Stephen Murray.

Scorpion Tales was first screened on ITV on 29 April 1978, running each Saturday until 29 May. The final episode was delayed until 12 August. The series failed to recapture the success of Thriller and was eclipsed by Armchair Thriller, which ITV were screening around the same time and was not renewed for a second series. Scorpion Tales was released on DVD by Network in December 2010, with a 15 certificate.

== Episode guide ==
Episode #	Title	Original air date (UK)	Writer	Director
1	"Easterman"	29 April 1978	Ian Kennedy Martin	David Reid
Plot: Soon to retire Detective Inspector Mavor becomes embroiled in a case involving a series of murders, carried out by the unknown "Easterman". On investigating he discovers that Easterman was the homosexual lover of a man he killed some time before and now he is out for revenge.
Cast: Trevor Howard (Mavor), Patrick Allen (Cummings), Don Henderson (Easterman), Paul Arlington (Purcell), Alan Rowe (Dr English), Maryann Turner (Alice Mavor), Will Knightley (Randwell), Patrick Godfrey (Russell), Andrew Andreas (Demetrius), David Foxxe (Constable Hallam)
2	"Killing"	6 May 1978	Bob Baker and Dave Martin	Don Leaver
Working on a computer project Martha Fredricks finds herself impeded by one of her colleagues Mark Hawkins. Hawkins is in secret communication with the computer, taking money from the bank to invest in the currency market. Collecting the interest and replacing the original money, he goes unnoticed, until Fredricks discovers his scheme.
Jack Shepherd (Mark Hawkins), Angela Down (Martha Fredricks), Michael O’Hagan (Ross Fredricks), James Lister (Ken Hassell), Clifford Kershaw (Jack), Vera Jakob (Mrs Judd), Jeanette Wild (Air Stewardess)
3	"The Great Albert"	13 May 1978	John Peacock	David Reid
Matthew Ward, a boy whose parents are on the verge of divorcing, discovers a 16th-century book of spells. With this he attempts to bring about events to his own wishes. However his plans go wrong when his mother brings home her lover who then murders his father.
Lynn Farleigh (Virginia Ward), Max Harris (Matthew Ward), Gwen Nelson (Mrs Withers), Paul Freeman (Oliver Benthall), Kenneth Gilbert (Peter Ward), Diana Rayworth (Jane Blake), Heffie Moraes (Tony), Frank Moorey (Policeman), Geoffrey Leesley (Gym Master), Angela Galbraith (Marian Greenwell), Peter Dennis (Jack Greenwell), Pamela Salem (Ursula), Antony Higginson (Victor)
4	"The Ghost in the Pale Blue Dress"	20 May 1978	Jeremy Burnham	David Reid
Seemingly estranged father and son Sir Wilfred and Toby are at loggerheads over the latter's inheritance. Toby's fiancée Karen steps in and beguiles Wilfred due to her similarity to his deceased wife. It is later revealed that Wilfred and Toby have been enacting a ruse, but Karen is still one step ahead.
Tony Britton (Sir Wilfred Grafton), Brian Stirner (Toby Grafton), Sandra Payne (Karen Oldfield), Basil Dignam (Clem Laidlaw), Geoffrey Palmer (Arnold Sparrow), Michael Cashman (Philip Jessop), John Cogan, Michael De Wilde, Peter Sutherland (Poker Players)
5	"Crimes of Persuasion"	27 May 1978	Nicholas Palmer	Shaun O'Riordan
Sir Robert Haines is in the process of making secret deals with an ex-Arab Prime Minister. Meanwhile, at home, his mistress Jean has hatched a plan to avenge his philandering. However, both of them later come unstuck when terrorist enemies of the Arab come calling.
Anthony Bate (Sir Robert), Susan Engel (Jean Newman), Christopher Benjamin (Arab), Raad Rawi (Young Arab), Chloe Salaman (Samatha Robinson), Brett Usher (Jeremy Hope), Saul Reichlin (Terrorist)
6	"Truth or Consequence"	12 August 1978	Brian Phelan	John Bruce
Lieutenant James White enrols in a training course, which will build his resistance to interrogation. As he proceeds however he discovers that the training is more intense than expected, and people on the outside world cannot be trusted.
David Robb (Lieutenant James White), Stephen Murray (Commodore Jacobs), Norman Jones (Major Chadwick), Rosie Kerslake (Penny), Graham Ashley (Captain Sutton), Eric Mason (Warrant Officer Watson), John Grillo (Ministry Official), Al Lampert (Mechanic), Cornelius Garrett (Young Officer), John Dawson (Waiter), Lewis Wilson (Train Passenger), David Arlen (Leading Rating)
