= Follow Me… =

1977 British children's TV series

- Written by: Bob Baker; Dave Martin
- Directed by: Peter Graham Scott
- Starring: Ronald Fraser; Ian Donnelly; Katharine Levy
- Country of origin: United Kingdom
- Original language: English
- No. of series: 1
- No. of episodes: 7

Production
- Executive producer: Patrick Dromgoole
- Producer: Peter Graham Scott
- Running time: 25 minutes
- Production company: HTV

Original release
- Network: ITV
- Release: 26 June – 7 August 1977

Follow Me… is a 1977 British children's television series written by Bob Baker and Dave Martin and created by HTV for ITV.

== Plot ==
Tom Dawes is staying with his father, Sid onboard his ship. Meanwhile Lynn, a runaway has a tape recorder with information that could jeopardise the plans of Colonel Gaines. Tom runs into Lynn and together try to find out what Colonel Gaines is planning.

== Cast ==
- Ronald Fraser as Sid Dawes
- Ian Donnelly as Tom Dawes
- Katherine Levy as Lynn
- Murray Hayne as Colonel Gaines
- Tony Wright as Baxter
- Godfrey James as Ted Southways
- Steve Emerson as Green
- Ewen Solon as Bert
- Richard Bartlett as Nigel
- Edmund Pegge as Forman

== Episodes ==
Episode Number	Original Broadcast Date
1	26 June 1977
2	3 July 1977
3	10 July 1977
4	17 July 1977
5	24 July 1977
6	31 July 1977
7	7 August 1977

== DVD release ==
Network released the series on DVD in 2013.
