= Children of the Stones =

1976 television drama series for children

- Genre: Fantasy; Drama; Children's
- Created by: Jeremy Burnham; Trevor Ray
- Directed by: Peter Graham Scott
- Starring: Iain Cuthbertson; Veronica Strong; Gareth Thomas; Freddie Jones; John Woodnutt
- Composer: Sidney Sager
- Country of origin: United Kingdom
- Original language: English
- No. of series: 1
- No. of episodes: 7

Production
- Executive producer: Patrick Dromgoole
- Producer: Peter Graham Scott
- Production location: Avebury, Wiltshire
- Running time: 30 minutes
- Production company: HTV West

Original release
- Network: ITV
- Release: 10 January – 21 February 1977

Related
- The Third Eye

Children of the Stones is a British television fantasy drama serial for children, produced by HTV in 1976 and broadcast on the United Kingdom's ITV network in January and February 1977. The serial was produced by Peter Graham Scott, with Patrick Dromgoole as executive producer. A novelisation by the serial's writers, Jeremy Burnham and Trevor Ray, also appeared in 1977. In the United States, it was broadcast on the Nickelodeon television channel in the early 1980s as part of the series The Third Eye.

The series is today considered a landmark in quality children's drama.

== Overview ==
The series follows the adventures of astrophysicist Adam Brake and his teenage son Matthew after they arrive in the small village of Milbury, which is built in the midst of a megalithic stone circle.

Filmed at Avebury, Wiltshire during the hot summer of 1976, with interior scenes filmed at HTV's Bristol studios, it has sinister, discordant wailing voices heightening the tension in the incidental music. The music was composed by Sidney Sager who used the Ambrosian Singers to chant in accordance with the megalithic rituals referred to in the story. Director Peter Graham Scott was surprised on seeing the script that the series was intended for children's airtime due to the complexities of the plot and the disturbing nature of the series.

Cast as the leader of the village, Hendrick, was Iain Cuthbertson, while the leading role of Adam Brake was filled by Gareth Thomas. Cuthbertson and Thomas had previously worked together on the TV series Sutherland's Law. Veronica Strong (the wife of series co-writer Jeremy Burnham) played Margaret Smythe, the curator of the local museum, who partners with Brake to solve the mystery. The child actors Peter Demin (aged 17 at the time of filming) and Katharine Levy played the teenage leads, Matthew (Brake's son) and Sandra (Smythe's daughter). Freddie Jones and John Woodnutt were cast as poacher Dai and butler Link.

== Episodes ==
Episodes were broadcast on ITV on Mondays at 16:45.

No.	Title	First broadcast
1	"Into the Circle"	10 January 1977
2	"Circle of Fear"	17 January 1977
3	"Serpent in the Circle"	24 January 1977
4	"Narrowing Circle"	31 January 1977
5	"Charmed Circle"	7 February 1977
6	"Squaring the Circle"	14 February 1977
7	"Full Circle"	21 February 1977

The series was repeated on ITV from 21 July 1978 to 1 September 1978, at 16:15. Since then, the programme has not been broadcast in its entirety on any UK television network.

== Plot outline ==
The village within the stone circle exists in a time rift, in which the same actions are played out (with minor variations) over and over again, the end result being that the power of the circle will eventually be released to the outside world. Whenever this is faulted, however, the time circle resets and the same events attempt again to unfold. However, since time is passing in the outside world in a normal way, time within the time circle must also progress, matching the time period of the real world while still attempting to play out the events within.

Four cycles of the time circle are clearly described in Children of the Stones.

=== The original circle ===
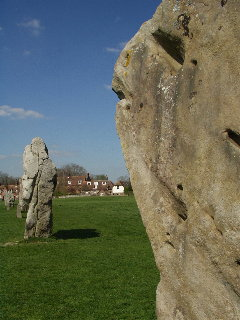
The Stones of Avebury (Milbury in the serial)

The original stone circle was built during the megalithic era by a pagan folk led by a Druid priest. The village priest then witnessed the formation of a supernova and somehow deduced that a black hole had formed shortly afterwards. Using a variety of psychic powers, mixed with folk magic, the priest was able to harness the power of the stones, which are natural magnets, and focus negative energy, via a beam of light, through the centre of the circle towards the black hole. This energy, however, was drawn from the minds of the inhabitants within the circle, taking their anger and fear to the black hole, and turning them into docile but happy creatures (hence "happy day") under the control of the Druid priest.

When a pair of travellers entered the village the Druid priest attempted to brainwash them as well, through the beam of light towards the black hole. The travellers outwitted the priest, however, and tricked him into thinking they had been brainwashed when the beam of light had not yet appeared. When the two travellers entered the circle of those who had already been taken in by the priest the circle of control was broken. The beam of light then appeared, much to the priest's horror, destroying his altar and turning the inhabitants of the circle to stone. The two travellers barely managed to escape the same fate and survived by hiding in a rock cave towards the edge of the stone circle, known as the sanctuary.

The events of the original circle were later recorded in a painting, which eventually made its way to become a key point of another cycle of the time circle.

=== The barber-surgeon ===
The barber-surgeon was an inhabitant of the village of Milbury, which had been built on the site of the stone circle. The events of the first circle began to unfold again in Milbury. The barber-surgeon, seeing what was taking place, protected himself by use of an amulet. The amulet was palm-sized and inscribed with a winged serpent.

The barber-surgeon presented a threat to whoever restarted the events of the First Circle and was crushed under a falling sarsen stone, also engraved with a serpent like the amulet the barber-surgeon carried. The amulet was crushed, along with the barber-surgeon; however, his bones were later removed and the stone that killed him was re-erected within the circle. Whoever caused the barber-surgeon to die did not succeed, and the time circle again reset itself into the modern age.

Dai the poacher's life, death and activities are markedly similar to those of the barber-surgeon, suggesting a link between the two characters.

=== Children of the Stones ===
The Time Circle again took another loop in the 1970s, when an astronomer, Rafael Hendrick, uncovered an ancient Dog Latin text about the Druid priest who saw a supernova explode in ancient times. Hendrick discovered the location of the supernova, a discovery that made him famous, and further learned that the supernova was now a black hole in the constellation of Ursa Major, the Great Bear.

Hendrick then travelled to Milbury, the site of the stone circle, and, through means left unexplained, learned how to harness the negative energy of the villagers into the beam of light towards the black hole. Through complex astronomical calculations he determined exactly when he could form the energy beam and began brainwashing the villagers into becoming what he called "Happy Ones".

The one challenge to Hendrick is posed by a poacher named Dai, but Dai suffers a mysterious death in the same location as the Barber-Surgeon had years earlier. Dai's body is also apparently replaced by a fallen stone carved with a serpent, but then both the stone and the body vanish. After Dai is killed pieces of a broken amulet are found, with those pieces matching exactly the gaps in the broken amulet of the Barber-Surgeon.

With nothing to stop Hendrick, one by one the villagers are brainwashed by the beam of light. Professor Brake's son, Matthew, is apparently psychic and has come across a painting that depicts the scene of the first circle. By the time Hendrick seeks to brainwash Brake and his son both have worked out that Milbury is replaying the events of the first circle and attempt to find a way to escape.

In the final episode Professor Brake and Matthew set Hendrick's digital timekeeping system ahead by five minutes, tricking Hendrick into thinking that they have been brainwashed by the energy beam. When they enter the circle of "Happy Ones" the power is broken. Hendrick is exposed to the beam of light and is metamorphosed into an image of the ancient Druid priest, while his butler, Link, covers his eyes for protection. The villagers are then turned to stone when they look at the beam of light from Hendrick's house. Professor Brake and Matthew attempt to save their friends Margaret and her daughter Sandra, but they both ignore warnings not to look back at the light and meet the same fate as the other villagers. The professor and his son escape to the Sanctuary, just as the ancient travellers did. When Brake and Matthew awake the next morning the village has changed back to normal, with only minor variations, and there is no sign that Hendrick or his plan ever existed.

The Brakes return to their lodging house and find Margaret, Sandra and the Brakes' housekeeper, who were all victims of the stone circle's power the previous evening, are now living their normal lives with no memory of recent events. Even the poacher, Dai, is now alive again and living in the Sanctuary. When the Brakes question him about what has happened, he admits he knows Professor Brake and Matthew but tells them he has no time for riddles, is not their friend, and to leave. As they do so, the serpent pattern from the amulet is seen below Dai's seat arranged in a pattern of bones. The Brakes then depart Milbury and Matthew wonders if the Time Circle has reset and if the events they have recently witnessed will happen again. Professor Brake jokingly asks Matthew if he would like to go back to the village and find out, but Matthew asks him to drive far away and to only stop off somewhere for something to eat.

=== Sir Joshua Litton ===
In the final scene of the series, shortly after Professor Brake and Matthew depart from the village a well-dressed man in an expensive motor car drives into Milbury. He looks identical to Rafael Hendrick. The man drives to Hendrick's old house, where he meets Link, Hendrick's former butler in the last round of the Time Circle, who now has a moustache and looks considerably younger.

The gentleman introduces himself as Sir Joshua Litton, a former professor at the University of Cambridge, and explains that he has come to Milbury from London. He comments on what a nice place Milbury will be to retire to and says that he will be very happy there.

== Credits ==
=== Cast ===
- Hendrick / Sir Joshua Litton: Iain Cuthbertson
- Adam: Gareth Thomas
- Dai: Freddie Jones
- Link: John Woodnutt
- Margaret: Veronica Strong
- Mrs Crabtree: Ruth Dunning
- Matthew: Peter Demin
- Sandra: Katharine Levy
- Kevin: Darren Hatch
- Jimmo: Gary Lock
- Dr Lyle: Richard Mathews
- Miss Clegg: June Barrie
- Browning: Hubert Tucker
- Mrs Warner: Peggy Ann Wood
- Bob: Ian Donnelly

=== Crew ===
- Written by: Jeremy Burnham and Trevor Ray
- Technical advisor: Dr Peter Williams
- Film cameras: Bob Edwards, Brian Morgan
- Film sound: Mike Davey, John Cross
- Film editor: Adrian Brenard
- Designer: Ken Jones
- Music composed by: Sidney Sager
- Executive Producer: Patrick Dromgoole
- Produced and Directed by: Peter Graham Scott

== Critical reception ==
Television historians Alistair McGown and Mark Docherty lauded the acting in Children of the Stones. They stated that "Iain Cuthbertson, one of the small screen’s most ebullient character actors, gives perhaps the most carefully subdued performance of his career in the serial". McGown and Docherty also praised the show's script, stating that "The script is a fairly complex blend of supernatural horror and science fiction which never talks down to the audience".

Stewart Lee commended the series in the 2007 BBC Four series Charlie Brooker's Screenwipe. Lee commented on depictions of teenagers on television in different decades, contrasting Children of the Stones with the Channel 4 drama Skins and arguing that Children of the Stones is still relevant to a modern audience. Several clips of the story were shown.

In 2012 Lee narrated a documentary on the series for BBC Radio Four. It was introduced as "the scariest programme ever made for children" and the music was described as "the most inappropriate theme music ever used for a children's series". Among the interviewees were Gareth Thomas and Katharine Levy, who both praised the high quality of the script. Levy said that the finished programme surpassed all their expectations and still stood up well. Jeremy Burnham, co-writer of the script, stated that although it was only seven episodes long, the series had stayed with him ever since due to the fans' interest.

Adam Scovell, writing for the British Film Institute, cited Children of the Stones as an example of the "folk horror" subgenre, because of the serial's use of an isolated rural setting and theme of ancient folklore awakening in the modern world.

== Availability ==
Children of the Stones was first released on Guild Home Video in 1981, becoming one of the earliest children's dramas to be released on the format. Due to an error on the front and rear of the sleeve listing it as running 1hr 38 mins, it was assumed to be in a heavily edited form. The tape however ran at 2hrs 32mins, meaning only that the opening and closing credits from the middle episodes had been removed, and certain scenes reordered. For example; In episode 1, we see Matthew fall from his bike before his father touches the stone. In the video version, we see him fall immediately after that scene. The series was re-released in 1992, again as a single uninterrupted feature. The serial has been released on DVD in 2002 by Second Sight in the UK and by Acorn Media in the US. The DVD includes interviews with actor Gareth Thomas and producer Peter Graham Scott.

The series was released once more in 2011 by Network. The Network release also contained a booklet by Tim Worthington on HTV's fantasy programming and a second disc featuring several episodes of HTV's other cult TV shows including: Sky, King of the Castle, The Clifton House Mystery and Into the Labyrinth. Unusually for a children's series, it was given a 12 certificate.

The serial was novelised by series writers Jeremy Burnham and Trevor Ray and released by Carousel Books in 1977. It was released in the US two years later. The novelisation was released in audiobook format by Fantom Films in August 2014, read by Gareth Thomas.

== Sequel ==
A sequel, Return to the Stones by Jeremy Burnham and Trevor Ray, was published as a Kindle e-book in November 2012 followed by the hardback edition on 8 July 2013.

== Podcast ==
The BBC issued a new audio adaptation as a 10-episode podcast in October 2020. It starred Reece Shearsmith, India Brown, Steve Oram and Ralph Ineson.
