= Raven (1977 TV series) =

1977 British children's TV series

- Written by: Trevor Ray; Jeremy Burnham
- Directed by: Michael Hart
- Starring: Phil Daniels; Michael Aldridge; Shirley Cheriton; Patsy Rowlands
- Country of origin: United Kingdom
- Original language: English
- No. of series: 1
- No. of episodes: 6

Production
- Producer: Colin Shindler
- Running time: 25 minutes
- Production company: ATV

Original release
- Network: ITV
- Release: 19 September – 24 October 1977

Raven is a British children's television drama series made for ITV by ATV in 1977. The series starred Phil Daniels in the title role.

== Story ==
An orphan and former borstal inmate sent on a rehabilitation programme, assisting an archaeology professor in his excavation of a system of caves and who subsequently is compelled to fight a plan to build a nuclear waste disposal plant on the site. The man-made cave system is underneath an ancient stone circle, and contains 5th-century rock carvings which may be connected to the legend of King Arthur and Arthurian lore. The professor believes that "Arthur" may not have been a single individual but an inherited office and he emphasises the notion of Arthur and his knights slumbering below the West Country landscape awaiting the call to return to action in a time of peril, more as an idea than a physical reality. The programme consistently featured the sign of Pluto (referencing Plutonium as a by-product of a nuclear reactions), a symbol for Raven's quest.

The core of the story is the central sage/apprentice hero relationship between Professor Young and Raven, representing the legend of Merlin and King Arthur, both characters having avian projections: Young as a merlin (a bird which often accompanies Raven throughout the story), and Raven (protected by his namesake bird raven at birth when abandoned by his parents).

== Cast ==
- Michael Aldridge as Prof. James Young
- Patsy Rowlands as Mrs. Young
- Phil Daniels as Raven
- Shirley Cheriton as Naomi Grant
- James Kerry as Bill Telford
- Tenniel Evans as Editor
- Blake Butler as Stone
- Ellis Jones as Vicar Wakefield
- Harold Innocent as Minister
- Hugh Thomas as Clive Castle
- Roger Milner as Ticket Collector
- Geoffrey Lumsden as Sir Lewis Gurney
- Terry Pearson as Scientist (uncredited)

== Production ==
Cast members in the serial included Michael Aldridge, Patsy Rowlands, James Kerry, Shirley Cheriton and Tenniel Evans.

== Reception ==
Television historians Alistair McGown and Mark Docherty praised Burnham and Ray's script for Raven, adding that although the story was fantasy, "it is the realist elements of the drama that continue to surprise". They also compared Raven with other fantasy TV programs of the era, including Sky, The Changes and King of the Castle.

== Novelisation ==
A novelisation of Raven by Burnham and Ray was published by Carousel Books (an imprint of Corgi Books) in 1977. The novelisation was republished by Fantom Publishing in 2014.

== Release ==
An episode of this series is available to view at the National Science and Media Museum in Bradford, UK.

The whole series of six parts was long been believed to be incomplete in the archives, until Network DVD, an independent DVD publishing company that specialises in classic British television, unearthed the original 2" VT tapes. Network released the series on DVD in 2010.
