= Veronica Strong =

British actress (born 1938)

- Born: 1938 (age 87–88); Eastry, Kent, England
- Occupation: Actress
- Years active: 1957–2014
- Spouse: Jeremy Burnham (m. 1966)

Veronica Strong (born 1938) is a British actress, best known for her roles in television series of the sixties and seventies including It's Dark Outside (1965), Virgin of the Secret Service (1968) and Children of the Stones (1977).

She made her debut in the TV series Studio E in 1957 and went on to appear in many popular programmes of the 1960s and 70s including No Hiding Place, The Baron, Adam Adamant Lives!, Armchair Theatre, The Avengers, Doomwatch and Dixon of Dock Green.

In 1965 she appeared as Claire Martin in the second series of It's Dark Outside and had recurring roles in An Enemy of the State (1965) and United! (1966). In 1968 she played secret agent Mrs. Cortez in tongue-in-cheek adventure series Virgin of the Secret Service. 1977 saw her essay the role of Margaret in the children's mini-series Children of the Stones, co-written by her husband the actor and writer Jeremy Burnham whom she married in 1966.
