= Sidney Sager =

English composer 1917–2002

Sidney Sager (17 May 1917 – 3 December 2002) was an English composer, conductor and trombonist, best known for his music for television and radio.

== Biography ==
=== Early life ===
Born into a Jewish family in London's East End, he joined the British Army at the age of 14 as a band boy, and as a result of his natural ability was sponsored by the Army to study at the Royal College of Music. He is the younger brother of Terry Burns (born Mark Sager) the medical inventor and picture restorer. There is also a half-brother, Edward Tunnicliff (born Edward Sager), who now lives in North Norfolk.

Sidney Sager's musical career was interrupted by the Second World War, during which he fought with the British Expeditionary Force in France and was evacuated from Dunkirk. Following a brief spell in England he was transferred to North Africa, where he served until the end of hostilities.

He returned to civilian life as a musician, playing brass for some time for the Royal Opera at Covent Garden.

=== Conductor ===
During the 1950s he studied composition and conducting in Geneva, and shortly after his return to the UK moved to Bristol, where he conducted the BBC West of England Light Orchestra and founded the Paragon, the city's first symphony orchestra, which subsequently reformed as Bristol Sinfonia.

=== Composer ===
Sager was involved for many years with the BBC Wildlife Unit at Bristol, although he also wrote scores for drama on television and radio. He is perhaps best known for the music he wrote for children's drama while Director of Music at HTV West from 1976 to 1992.

=== Television work ===
- Expedition ins Unbekannte (1958) TV series by Hans Hass (West Germany)
- Saturday Playhouse (TV Series); Haul for the Shore (1959), Devonshire Cream (1960)
- Play for Today TV series; The Fishing Party (1972), Shakespeare or Bust (1973), Three for the Fancy (1974)
- Children of the Stones (1977) TV series
- King of the Castle (1977) TV series
- The Clifton House Mystery (1978) TV series
- Into the Labyrinth (1981) TV series

One of the most well-remembered programmes he scored was The Best of Friends, starring John Gielgud, Wendy Hiller, and Patrick McGoohan as Sydney Cockerell, Laurentia McLachlan, and George Bernard Shaw respectively. This work was scored for string quintet modelled after Schubert.

He also composed orchestral, band and choral works for festivals, often with children's themes (much like his television scores). In 1960 he wrote the score for Delilah The Sensitive Cow, a story written and narrated by his friend Johnny Morris, the television presenter, which was released as a record by Decca.

==== Children of the Stones ====
For Children of the Stones, Sager's combination of A cappella vocalizations fixated on a single, repeated Icelandic word ("Hadave"), along with its dissonant wordless counterpoint, made this score unique among children's programming. The vocals were provided by the Ambrosian Singers, featuring Lynda Richardson on the solo soprano line. The vocals were supplemented by electric guitar, bass guitar and percussion.

The main theme of Children of the Stones is written on the acoustic scale, ambiguously fluctuating between a tonality of C and D major. A signature two-chord harmonic progression, Em9 to G/C, is heard throughout the seven-part series at key dramatic points. A secondary theme is treated in canon and is diegetic music, representing a hymn sung by the spellbound villagers in the story. This theme is later echoed in the guitar and bass when the main child protagonist, Matt, uses his latent psychometric abilities. The secondary theme also concludes the series in a light jazz arrangement, establishing a lighter tone before the final twist is revealed.

The musical texture was the suggestion of producer Peter Graham Scott, who, while driving to Avebury to begin filming, had heard music by Krzysztof Penderecki on the radio.

=== Marriage and children ===
Sidney Sager married Naomi Burgess, who he met while working at the BBC in 1964. They have one child, Daniel.
