= Target (British TV series) =

British TV police drama series (1977–1978)

- Genre: Action; Police
- Created by: Graham Williams
- Written by: Bob Baker; Dave Martin; David Wickes
- Starring: Patrick Mower; Philip Madoc; Brendan Price; Vivien Heilbron
- Country of origin: United Kingdom
- Original language: English
- No. of series: 2
- No. of episodes: 17

Production
- Producer: Philip Hinchcliffe
- Production location: Southampton
- Running time: 50 minutes

Original release
- Network: BBC1
- Release: 9 September 1977 – 10 November 1978

Target is a British police action drama series, which ran from 1977 to 1978, on BBC1. Set in Southampton, it starred Patrick Mower as Det. Supt. Steve Hackett, Brendan Price as Det. Sgt. Frank Bonney, Vivien Heilbron as Det. Sgt. Louise Colbert and Philip Madoc as Det. Chief Supt. Tate. Seventeen fifty-minute episodes were produced and the theme music was by Dudley Simpson. It was the BBC's response to ITV's successful series The Sweeney, but received criticism for its levels of violence and lasted for only two series.

== Background ==
Target was set in Southampton and involved the 13th Regional Crime Squad. The series was originally developed under the title Hackett by former Z-Cars script editor Graham Williams, but he was asked to swap roles with the outgoing producer of Doctor Who, Philip Hinchcliffe. Hinchcliffe retitled the show Target. He also persuaded the BBC to make the series entirely on film instead of the usual BBC production method at the time of mixing video studio scenes with film for location work.

== Initial reaction ==
At the time, the show was criticised for its level of violence. The BBC's Director of Programmes, Alasdair Milne, reportedly received 5,000 letters of complaint from Mary Whitehouse's League of Light. Its release also coincided with the publication of the Belson Report (Television violence and the adolescent boy). The first series was curtailed and the second series toned down the level of violence.

== Cancellation ==
A third series was mooted, with Robert Banks Stewart taking over as producer. He spent two weeks in the producer's role, during which he planned to change the supporting cast, reduce the violence and steer the show further away from The Sweeney. Banks Stewart wanted James Bolam as the new lead but Bolam preferred to do one final series of When the Boat Comes In first.

Different reasons have been given for the cancellation of Target. According to Philip Hinchcliffe's account on the DVD commentary for Doctor Who serial The Seeds of Doom, the series was ultimately cancelled because Alasdair Milne didn't like it. Banks Stewart said he was asked by Graeme MacDonald, the BBC's Head of Series and Serials, whether he would prefer to scrap Target altogether and produce a new series. He then devised the private eye drama Shoestring. However, Patrick Mower offered a view which was slightly different: he wanted to terminate his commitment anyway. With reference to the rather unfortunate fate of The Professionals lead actor Lewis Collins who found himself almost permanently typecast as a hard man, action hero, Mower emphasized in the late 1990s that he did not like to be identified with one particular role and, for this reason, he had made it his policy never to appear in a series for more than two years.

Some of the episodes were written by David Wickes, who also wrote scripts for The Professionals (starring Lewis Collins) and his production company, David Wickes Productions, produced The New Professionals in 1999.

== Cars ==
Like The Sweeney, the cars used were Fords, mostly Cortinas and Granadas. However, Hackett's personal car, seen in several episodes, is a 1969 Mercury Cougar.

== Official releases ==
In 1983, the BBC released the pilot episode of the series on VHS tape. However, no further releases were forthcoming.

Four episodes from the first series – Shipment, Big Elephant, Lady Luck and Carve Up – were repeated out of sequence immediately after the second series, while all but two episodes of the second series – The Trouble with Charlie and Figures of Importance – were repeated in a late night slot in the spring of 1980. The first series aired on now-defunct British Satellite Broadcasting cable channel, Galaxy, in 1990.

All seventeen episodes survive in C1 format (16 mm film), in the BBC archives. Some sources, such as Halliwell/Purser, claim that there were twenty-two episodes but this is simply a mistake.

== Novels ==
Two Target novels were published. It seems that writers, Michael Feeney Callan and Simon Masters, were asked to turn their scripts into novels, so that the BBC could put them on the market.

== Episodes ==
=== Series 1 ===
No.	Title	Directed by	Written by	Original release date
1	"Shipment"	David Wickes	David Wickes & Philip Hinchcliffe	9 September 1977
Hackett follows up on information about dodgy dealings aboard an international cargo ship provided by a murdered snitch.
2	"Blow Out"	Douglas Camfield	Roger Marshall	16 September 1977
Hackett is baffled by a series of jewel thefts and turns to a prisoner awaiting release for help.
3	"Big Elephant"	Douglas Camfield	Bob Baker & Dave Martin	23 September 1977
A sailor tries to sell a package of stolen drugs he believes to be hashish, but it is actually heroin.
4	"Hunting Parties"	Christopher Menaul	Bob Baker & Dave Martin	30 September 1977
A revolutionary action group interrupts a burglary at a former villain's home. Hackett and the victim's family try to track them down.
5	"Vandraggers"	Francis Megahy	Bernie Cooper & Francis Megahy	14 October 1977
An electronics shipment has been hi-jacked, prompting Hackett to empty a bank's safety deposit boxes.
6	"Lady Luck"	Terry Green	Ray Jenkins	21 October 1977
Hackett quits the force in disgrace after being accused of accepting a bribe. He arranges to sell police files to people traffickers to pay for his enforced retirement.
7	"Set Up"	Jim Goddard	Ray Jenkins	28 October 1977
Hackett is suspended for alleged corruption. "If you're innocent, stand and fight" pleads Ros. So why's Hackett on the run?
8	"Roadrunner"	Mike Vardy	James Clare	4 November 1977
Hackett investigates the hijacking of a truck and the subsequent murder of its driver by a hitchhiker and uncovers pilfering at an electronics plant.
9	"Carve Up"	Ben Bolt	Bob Baker & Dave Martin	11 November 1977
Hackett investigates possible police corruption in relation to bids for a city development project and is led into an embarrassing triangle with the daughter of a chief superintendent.

=== Series 2 ===
No.	Title	Directed by	Written by	Original release date
10	"Rogues' Gallery"	Mike Vardy	Bob Baker & Dave Martin	15 September 1978
Hackett investigates the curious theft of rare old paintings from wealthy homes and finds a dedicated young woman determined to advance the careers of several young artists.
11	"A Good and Faithful Woman"	Ben Bolt	Richard Harris	22 September 1978
Hackett investigates the curious theft of rare old paintings from wealthy homes and finds a dedicated young woman determined to advance the careers of several young artists.
12	"Queen's Pardon"	David Wickes	David Wickes	29 September 1978
Hackett has to deal with a hostage situation when a disturbed father demands a pardon for his son who was executed for murder fifteen years before.
13	"Fringe Banking"	Terry Green	Ken Follett	13 October 1978
Hackett stumbles onto a scheme to acquire a struggling construction company that is in line to win a lucrative government contract.
14	"Promises"	Gordon Flemyng	Tony Hoare	20 October 1978
A young squad member is murdered when accompanying a key witness to the trial of a prominent gangster.
15	"The Trouble with Charlie"	Peter Smith	Dave Humphries	27 October 1978
Hackett meets an old flame at the airport but her current boyfriend gets involved in a cocaine deal that goes wrong.
16	"Figures of Importance"	Christopher Menaul	Christopher Menaul	3 November 1978
Hackett's former fiancée is killed by a strong arm man. He and her delinquent son want to find out who killed her and why.
17	"The Run"	Terry Green	Peter J. Hammond	10 November 1978
Hackett uses an accountant to get evidence against a porn publisher who is buying drugs with smuggled gold.
