= At the Stroke of Nine =

1957 British film by Lance Comfort

- Original British lobby card
- Directed by: Lance Comfort
- Written by: Harry Booth; Brian Clemens; Michael Deeley; Jon Penington
- Produced by: Harry Booth; Michael Deeley; Jon Penington
- Starring: Patricia Dainton; Stephen Murray; Patrick Barr; Dermot Walsh
- Cinematography: Gerald Gibbs
- Music by: Edwin Astley
- Production company: Towers of London Productions
- Distributed by: Grand National (UK)
- Release date: June 1957
- Running time: 71 minutes
- Country: United Kingdom
- Language: English
- Budget: £20,000

At the Stroke of Nine is a 1957 British crime film directed by Lance Comfort and starring Patricia Dainton, Stephen Murray, Patrick Barr and Dermot Walsh. It was written by Harry Booth, Brian Clemens, Michael Deeley and Jon Penington. A female journalist is kidnapped by a madman who forces her to write articles about him and threatens to kill her.

== Plot ==
When reporter Sally Bryant chases a major scoop, she is captured by concert pianist Stephen Garrett, who says he will murder her within the next five days. He forces her to send daily reports of her ordeal to her newspaper. The typeface of the reports gives a clue to the police, who reach Garrett's house in time to prevent him from strangling Sally. Garrett falls out of a window to his death.

== Cast ==
- Patricia Dainton as Sally Bryant
- Stephen Murray as Stephen Garrett
- Patrick Barr as Frank
- Dermot Walsh as MacDonnell
- Clifford Evans as Inspector Hudgell
- Leonard White as Thompson
- Reginald Green as Toby
- Alexander Doré as Carter
- Leonard Sharp as news vendor
- Robert Hartley as Westcott
- Frank Atkinson as porter
- William Moore as Campion
- Marianne Stone as secretary
- George Lee as young reporter
- William Hepper as clerk
- Donald B. Edwards as Gray

== Reception ==
The Monthly Film Bulletin wrote: "This implausible melodrama has little to recommend it. The villain has no virtues and the hero no vices; the heroine registers suitable cold terror: and the script calls for little more from them."

Picture Show called the film a "taut and suspenseful drama."

TV Guide wrote, "the frantic search for the loonie by police offers some interesting scenes with fair suspense."
