= Nicholas Dromgoole =

British ballet critic (1927–2023)

Nicholas Arthur Dromgoole (3 December 1927 – 20 September 2023) was a British ballet critic.

== Biography ==
Born in Maranhão, Brazil, he was the third son of Nicholas Arthur Dromgoole, a Civil Service telegraphist, and Violet Brookes. A younger brother was Patrick Dromgoole. The family relocated to England during Dromgoole's infancy.

Dromgoole attended Dulwich College and later St Edmund Hall, Oxford, where he studied history. At Oxford University, he was a member of the University Ballet Club, joining peers such as Clement Crisp, John Percival, and Clive Barnes.

After a brief period of study at the Sorbonne and a personal tragedy, Dromgoole established an educational institution in England. By the age of 27, he served as headmaster of Pierrepont School, Frensham. One of his students, Robert North, would later become a prominent ballet choreographer.

In 1962, Dromgoole moved to London, assuming the chairmanship of the Institute of Choreology, later known as the Benesh Institute. He also introduced a humanities department at the Sir John Cass College, where he remained for four decades. Concurrently, he managed the college's rugby team.

By 1965, Dromgoole was appointed a ballet critic for The Sunday Telegraph, a position he held for three decades. During this tenure, he covered significant developments in ballet, including the trajectory of the Royal Ballet and the growth of contemporary British dance companies.

Dromgoole's personal life included a marriage to ballet dancer Lesley Collier in 1977. Professionally, he authored several books on subjects ranging from the role of critics to the language of gesture in theatre. Additionally, he provided introductions for a number of classic plays. Dromgoole was a member of the Garrick Club in London.
