= Chris Harris (actor) =

Mime artist

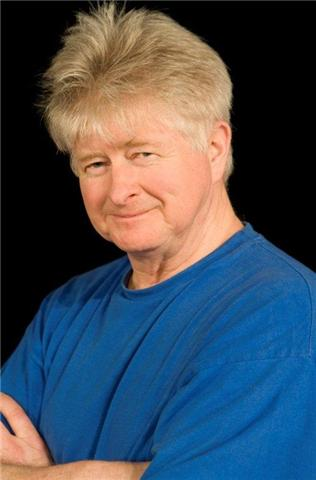
- Harris in 2010
- Born: 14 December 1942; Bridgwater, Somerset, England
- Died: 30 April 2014 (aged 71); Portishead, Somerset, England
- Education: Rose Bruford College
- Occupations: Actor, director, writer
- Known for: Pantomime
- Television: Into the Labyrinth

Chris Harris (14 December 1942 – 30 April 2014) was an English actor, director and writer. He appeared in several UK TV series including Into the Labyrinth and Hey Look That's Me. He also built a successful career in pantomime, acting as a pantomime dame, as well as being a director and writer at the Bristol Old Vic and the Theatre Royal, Bath. He lived in Portishead in North Somerset.

== Career ==
Born in Bridgwater, Somerset, Harris studied drama at the Rose Bruford College, then went into rep., which culminated in two years with the Bristol Old Vic Theatre Company.

He attended the Jacques Lecoq's L'École Internationale de Théâtre Jacques Lecoq in Paris, Ladislav Fialka's Pantomime Company in Prague, and was for a short time at the Moscow State Circus School. In 1966 he was in his first pantomime at the Salisbury Playhouse with Stephanie Cole. From 1976 until his death, he performed his one-man comedy shows around the world.

Harris was a regular visiting lecturer for the Bristol Old Vic Theatre School, and was a former member of the Royal Shakespeare Company. He co-directed the opera Griselda for the Buxton Festival, and appeared in two productions for Dutch Television with members of the Welsh National Opera. He spent nine years, up until 2000 writing, directing and starring in pantomimes for the Bristol Old Vic and since then had done the same for the Theatre Royal, Bath.

== Death ==
Harris died of cancer at the age of 71 on 30 April 2014.

== Television appearances ==
- Hey Look That's Me - 1976–84
- The Rocking Horse Winner - 1977
- Into the Labyrinth – 1982
- Chasing Rainbows – A Nation and Its Music - 1986

== Radio appearances ==
- The Chris Harris Road Show, BBC Radio Bristol.
- The Birds
- Hiawatha
- Harvey Angel

== One man stage shows ==
- Kemp's Jig
- That's The Way To Do It!
- Ally Sloper's Half Holiday
- Beemaster
- 'Arris Music 'All
- A Night At The Pantomime

== Books written or co-written by Harris ==
- Will Kemp, Shakespeare's Forgotten Clown (1983), ISBN 0-907128-09-2
- The Alphabet of Pantomime: There be Nothing Like a Dame (2000) ISBN 0-9539267-0-2
- Cinderella (2002), ISBN 0-85676-251-2
- Aladdin (2002) ISBN 0-85676-252-0
- Jack and the Beanstalk (2002)ISBN 0-856-76255-5
- Mother Goose (2002) ISBN 0-85676-256-3
- Babes in the Wood (2002) ISBN 0-85676-257-1
- Dick Whittington (2002) ISBN 0-85676-250-4
