= King of the Castle (TV series) =

1977 British children's TV series

- Genre: Fantasy; Drama; Children's
- Written by: Bob Baker; Dave Martin
- Country of origin: United Kingdom
- Original language: English
- No. of series: 1
- No. of episodes: 7 (list of episodes)

Production
- Running time: 30 minutes
- Production company: HTV West

Original release
- Network: ITV
- Release: 8 May – 19 June 1977

King of the Castle is a British children's television fantasy drama serial made by HTV for ITV in 1977.

== Production ==
Written by Bob Baker and Dave Martin, the series is a surreal tale centred on a lonely young boy, Roland Wright, who lives unhappily in a council flat with his father Ron and stepmother June. Escaping from a gang of local bullies in a malfunctioning lift, Roland finds himself transported to a strange fantasy environment where people and places are twisted variations of those he sees in his real life.

King of the Castle was one of HTV's most ambitious productions. HTV spent £300,000 on production (a large sum for a children's programme) and the producers spent nine months auditioning 200 actors to play the part of Roland.

Originally, King of the Castle had been intended to air in the children's television slot. However, ITV's Network Planning Committee deemed the programme "too scary" for children to watch alone. King of the Castle was delayed for four months. It was eventually broadcast in the "Sunday teatime slot", for programmes for parents and children to watch together.

Philip Da Costa starred as Roland, while other prominent roles were played by Talfryn Thomas, Fulton Mackay, Milton Johns and Angela Richards.

== Episode guide ==
1. TX: 8 May 1977 (17:45) - Roland Wright has just moved into a new block of flats which has a broken lift and a dangerous staircase. Being bright and intelligent, he is a natural victim for the Ripper, leader of the gang who haunts the stairways...
2. TX: 15 May 1977 (17:45) - Roland wakes up to find himself in the strange world of the Castle, where he meets Vein, the keeper of the keys.
3. TX: 22 May 1977 (17:45) - Fleeing from Hawkspur and Ergon, Roland is confronted by the Warrior. Narrowly escaping, he meets the Lady - a glamorous, self-styled clairvoyant.
4. TX: 29 May 1977 (17:45) - Roland is captured by a castle guard and sent to the kitchens as a skivvy. He plans to escape, but is betrayed and trapped in the Castle.
5. TX: 5 June 1977 (17:00) - Roland attempts to argue his case in front of the Lord, and after some difficulty, he gets through the ante-chamber to face the Warrior...
6. TX: 12 June 1977 (17:00) - Roland decides to make numerous changes before he escapes, but everyone is plotting against him...
7. TX: 19 June 1977 (17:00) - Roland is put on trial, where all the witnesses are hostile. Then he meets his old enemy, Ripper, for a final confrontation.
- Episodes 1 and 2 directed by Peter Hammond, Episodes 3, 5 & 7 directed by Terry Harding, Episodes 4 & 6 directed by Leonard White.
- Episodes were 30 minutes in duration, including advertisements.
- For the sword fight between Roland and the Warrior in Episode 5, John V. Clarke of the British Kendo Association was brought in to act as fight adviser — for which he received an on-screen credit on the closing titles.

== DVD release ==
- The complete series was released by Network DVD exclusively through their online website on 8 June 2009. Since Episode 3 no longer exists in the archives in any broadcast quality format, the version on the DVD release is sourced from an off-air VHS videocassette recording.

== Reception ==
The Guinness Book of Classic British TV noted that King of the Castle was one of several prominent ITV telefantasy series for younger viewers in this period (along with The Ghosts of Motley Hall, Sky, Children of the Stones and Raven). The Hill and Beyond: Children's Television Drama said about King of the Castle: "it is clearly a highly intelligent and particularly sinister story...King of the Castle is a one of a kind and children's television hasn't seen the like of it since."

== Novelisation ==
In 2016, Bob Baker wrote an novelisation of King of the Castle, which was published by Fantom Publishing.
