= Joanne Francis =

Fictional character from the BBC soap opera EastEnders

- EastEnders character
- Portrayed by: Pamela Salem
- Duration: 1988–1989
- First appearance: Episode 351; 16 June 1988
- Last appearance: Episode 408; 3 January 1989
In-universe information
- Occupation: Manager; Gangster

Joanne Francis is a fictional character from the BBC soap opera EastEnders, played by Pamela Salem. She appears on screen between 16 June 1988 and 3 January 1989, as the Manager of Strokes Wine Bar.

== Character creation and development ==
=== Background ===
One of the most popular characters in the early years of EastEnders was Den Watts (Leslie Grantham). The character was deemed so popular by the producers of the serial, that when Grantham announced he was quitting the soap in November 1987, creators Julia Smith and Tony Holland devised a storyline that would keep the character on screen for a further year, while only requiring Grantham to commit to a couple of months filming. This was done by sending Den to prison on remand and mixing the previously filmed prison storyline in with the current happenings in Albert Square. On screen, the build-up to Grantham's exit occurred throughout 1988, as Den, always portrayed as a petty criminal with shady connections, was recruited to work for the more serious East End organised crime operation, known as The Firm. Various characters were introduced as part of the storyline. Among them was Joanne Francis, a middle classed "hard woman", who was brought in to be the manager of Strokes winebar, a facade for an illegal gambling den owned by The Firm.

=== Casting ===
Actress Pamela Salem was given the role of Joanne. Salem had known Grantham for many years prior to her casting. Before EastEnders went to air, Grantham had served time in Wormwood Scrubs prison for the murder of a taxi driver, and occasionally actors were brought in to entertain the prisoners. Among the visiting actors were Louise Jameson (who later went on to play Rosa di Marco) and Salem. Both actresses were instrumental in introducing Grantham to acting while he was in prison, and helping him to enroll in drama school upon his release. Salem had already auditioned for a part in EastEnders, Jan Hammond, the mistress of Den Watts. She was unsuccessful, and that part went to Jane How; however, Grantham later persuaded the casting director of EastEnders to give Salem the role of Joanne.

== Storylines ==
Joanne is first seen in Albert Square in June 1988. She is a member of the gangster organisation known as The Firm, and is sent to Walford by Mr Vinnicombe (The Firm's boss) to manage Strokes Winebar, which is actually a facade for an illegal gambling den. Her arrival upsets Den Watts (Leslie Grantham), as he had thought that he was being given managerial status. Despite initial hostility, Joanne and Den prove to be a good team and build up a strong working relationship.

Den, however, is too unpredictable for the Firm's liking, and after his best friend's wife, Kathy Beale (Gillian Taylforth), is raped by rival wine-bar owner James Willmott-Brown (William Boyde) he goes against the Firm's orders and instigates a revenge attack without their approval. With the help of another member of The Firm, Brad Williams (Jonathan Stratt), he has Willmott-Brown's winebar set on fire. This leads to a police investigation, putting Strokes under surveillance and The Firm under suspicion. In order to put the police off, The Firm decide that Den has to take the blame for the arson. Den unwillingly does so following pressure from Joanne, and then goes into hiding to avoid arrest. However, The Firm's real agenda is to lure Den into a false sense of security before killing him, thus stopping him implicating them for their heinous crimes. Realising this, Den manages to escape The Firm and goes on the run, but when The Firm trace him to his hideout, he is forced to turn himself in to the police in order to avoid being killed. Den is sent to Dickens Hill prison, leaving The Firm to assume that it will only be a matter of time before Den divulges his knowledge about their criminal antics. Actually, Den has no intention of grassing, but the investigating officer, D.I. West, decides to play up to The Firm's fears, spreading rumours that Den is on the verge of implicating them. Gregory Mantel (Pavel Douglas), a superior member of The Firm, makes plans to have Den eradicated from within prison. Joanne does not believe that Den is an informant and she tries to do everything she can to stop her associates from setting up a hit on him, even going above Mantel's head and relaying her doubts to Mr Vinnicombe, which earns her the wrath of Mantel, but manages to spare Den's life temporarily.

Joanne moves into a flat in Albert Square and continues running Strokes, but her position is put in jeopardy when a new Detective Inspector, Bob Ashley (Robin Lermitte), starts to take umbrage with her presence in Walford. He begins putting pressure on Brad Williams to frame The Firm, threatening him with prison unless he obliges. Brad divulges the whereabouts of evidence that will show Joanne's criminal dealings, enabling him to get rid of her and close down Strokes. Sensing her imminent downfall, Joanne considers resigning from The Firm. This does not please Mantel; he reminds her not to 'rock the boat' or else she will meet the same fate as her late husband. It is revealed that Joanne's husband had also been employed by The Firm, and his association had led to his untimely demise. So Joanne flees, stealing thousands of pounds of The Firm's money in the process. Her exit is nearly halted by a speeding car, driven by Brad, who has been instructed by Mantel to eliminate her. Brad misses his target and she manages to escape unharmed. Her last appearance is in January 1989. Strokes closes down soon after.
