= Pamela Salem =

British actress (1944–2024)

- Salem as Joanne Francis in EastEnders
- Born: Pamela Fortunee Salem; 22 January 1944; Bombay, Bombay Province, British Raj
- Died: 21 February 2024 (aged 80); Surfside, Florida, US
- Education: Heidelberg University; Central School of Speech and Drama
- Occupations: Film and television actress
- Known for: Never Say Never Again (film, 1983) as Miss Moneypenny; Into the Labyrinth (1981–1982); EastEnders (1988–1989); Doctor Who
- Spouse: Michael O'Hagan (m. 1983; died 2017)

Pamela Fortunee Salem (22 January 1944 – 21 February 2024) was a British film and television actress. She was born in Bombay, India, and educated at Wispers School and Heidelberg University in Germany, and later at the Central School of Speech and Drama in London, England.

== Career ==
=== Television ===
Salem was known for her co-starring role in the early 1980s ITV children's fantasy series Into the Labyrinth as the evil witch Belor, and her late 1980s guest role in the BBC soap opera EastEnders as shady mafia affiliate Joanne Francis. She was also seen in two highly celebrated adventures of Doctor Who: as Toos in The Robots of Death (1977) and as Professor Rachel Jensen in Remembrance of the Daleks (1988), a role she reprised for Big Finish Productions' officially licensed audio drama spin-off series Counter Measures. She was also heard as one of the many voices of Xoanon in The Face of Evil (1977). She had auditioned for the role of the Fourth Doctor's companion Leela but the role went to Louise Jameson. Salem also had a recurring role in the British sitcom French Fields from 1989 to 1991. She had one of the lead roles in the airline drama series Buccaneer in 1980. Other television guest appearances included roles in popular British series such as Out of the Unknown, Blake's 7 (as Kara in "Cygnus Alpha", 1978), The Onedin Line, The Professionals (episodes "The Female Factor", 1978, and "Fall Girl", 1978), Howards' Way, Ever Decreasing Circles, Tripods, episodes of All Creatures Great and Small as Zoe Bennett; and later on in American series including Magnum, P.I., Party of Five, ER and The West Wing where she played a British prime minister.

=== Film ===
In film, Salem played the role of Miss Moneypenny in the 'unofficial' 1983 James Bond film Never Say Never Again, starring Sean Connery. She also appeared in Michael Crichton's The First Great Train Robbery (1979, another film which starred Connery), as well as supporting roles in The Bitch (1979), Night Train to Murder (1983), After Darkness (1985), Thirteen at Dinner (1985), Salome (1986), God's Outlaw (1987), Succubus (1987), Gods and Monsters (1998), Quicksand (2002) and April's Shower (2003). She can also be heard as the Queen in the English dub of "Hellsing Ultimate OVA IV" (2008).

== Personal life and death ==
Salem was married to the actor Michael O'Hagan until his death on 1 November 2017. They lived in Surfside, Florida, where she died on 21 February 2024, at the age of 80.

== Filmography ==
=== Film ===
Year	Title	Role	Notes
1976	No Longer Alone	Actress In TV Studio	
1978	The First Great Train Robbery	Emily Trent	
1979	The Bitch	Lynn	
1982	The Secret of Seagull Island	Carol	
1983	Never Say Never Again	Miss Moneypenny	
1986	Salomè	Herodias	
1986	God's Outlaw	Lady Anne Walsh	
1997	River Made to Drown In	Lady in Gallery 4	
1998	Gods and Monsters	Sarah Whale	
1998	Suicide, the Comedy	Winnie	
2002	Quicksand	Peggy	
2002	The Book of Eve	Goldie	
2003	April's Shower	Anna	
2007	Wide Awake	Mrs. Burns	
2008	A Necessary Death	Matt's Mother	
2011	Pig	Narrator	
2019	Down's Revenge	Mrs. McBride	

=== Television ===
Year	Title	Role	Notes
1969	Happy Ever After	Miss Grimble	Episode: "Feeling the Pinch"
1971	Out of the Unknown	Jeanette	Episode: "The Sons and Daughters of Tomorrow"
1971	Jason King	Alexandra Lanova	Episode: "To Russia with... Panache"
1972	The Onedin Line	Emma Callon	2 episodes
1972	Man at the Top	Jane Wilson	2 episodes
1972	The Adventurer	Michele	Episode: "Return to Sender"
1972	New Scotland Yard	Ann Denbury	Episode: "Two Into One Will Go"
1974	The Carnforth Practice	Dr. Helen Rheinman	5 episodes
1974	The Early Life of Stephen Hind	Sarah Bernard	2 episodes
1977	Van der Valk	Millie Sanger	Episode: "Dead on Arrival"
1977, 1988	Doctor Who	Xoanon / Toos / Rachel	9 episodes (Serials: The Face of Evil, The Robots of Death, Remembrance of the Daleks)
1978	Blake's 7	Kara	Episode: "Cygnus Alpha"
1978	Scorpion Tales	Ursula	Episode: "The Great Albert"
1978	Tycoon	Marjorie Reynolds	Episode: "Personal Account"
1978	The Professionals	Marikka Schuman / Ann Seaford	2 episodes
1978–1988	All Creatures Great and Small	Zoe Bennett	5 episodes
1979	General Hospital (British TV series)	Angela Wilding	Episode: "Technical Hitch"
1980	Flesh and Blood	Jill Cornforth	Episode: "Time of Life"
1980	Buccaneer	Monica Burton	13 episodes
1981	Seagull Island	Carol	3 episodes
1981–1982	Into the Labyrinth	Belor	21 episodes
1981–1984	Crown Court	Juliet Parkinson	4 episodes
1982	Strangers	Helena Russell	Episode: "A Much Underestimated Man"
1983	The Consultant	Jennifer	3 episodes
1984	The Tripods	Countess	4 episodes
1984	Ever Decreasing Circles	Sue	Episode: "A Married Man"
1984	Night Train to Murder	Cousin Zelda	Television film
1985	Magnum, P.I.	Alyce	Episode: "Deja Vu"
1985	Thirteen at Dinner	Mrs. Wildburn	Television film
1985	Lytton's Diary	Isabelle de Montfort	Episode: "The Lady in the Mask"
1986	Chance in a Million	Cousin Mary	Episode: "Guess Who's Not Coming to Dinner"
1986	Howards' Way	Mrs. Travis	3 episodes
1987	Boon	Davida Duff	Episode: "Credit Where It's Due"
1987	Succubus	Joy	Television film
1988–1989	EastEnders	Joanne Francis	37 episodes
1989–1991	French Fields	Chantal Moriac	18 episodes
1990	El C.I.D.	Lisa	Episode: "A Proper Copper"
1990	Chain	Vivienne Lynton	Episode: "David Lynton"
1990	The Paradise Club	Delia Rich	Episode: "Dead Dogs Don't Bark"
1992	Perfect Scoundrels	Julia Jones	Episode: "The Goodbye Look"
1993	Then Churchill Said to Me	Baroness Hannah von Thump	Episode: "The Goose Has Landed"
1993	Don't Leave Me This Way	Sandra Neil	Television film
1996	ER	Marian Vucelich	Episode: "True Lies"
2000	Party of Five	Ms. Shaw	3 episodes
2003	L/R: Licensed by Royalty	Mrs. Butterfield	Episode: "Gyakuten no hosoku"
2005	The West Wing	P.M. Maureen Graty	Episode: "The Wake Up Call"
2008	Hellsing	The Queen	Episode: "Hellsing Ultimate, Vol. 4"
2010	Big Love	—N/a	Episode: "Under the Roof"
