= Bob Baker (scriptwriter) =

British television and film writer (1939–2021)

- Born: Robert John Baker; 26 July 1939; Bristol, England
- Died: 3 November 2021 (aged 82)
- Occupations: Screenwriter, television writer
- Spouse: Marie Baker
- Children: 8
- Writing career
- Period: 1971–2010
- Genres: Comedy, drama, science fiction

Robert John Baker (26 July 1939 – 3 November 2021) was a British television and film writer. He was best known for working on the original run of Doctor Who, and for being a co-writer of the Wallace & Gromit films The Wrong Trousers, A Close Shave, Wallace & Gromit: The Curse of the Were-Rabbit and A Matter of Loaf and Death (in which the character Baker Bob is named after him).

== Career ==
Baker and Dave Martin began writing for Harlech Television (HTV), the local ITV franchise. One of their earliest works was Thick As Thieves starring Leonard Rossiter.

Baker wrote for Doctor Who between 1971 and 1979. For all but the last of his contributions to this series (Nightmare of Eden), Baker collaborated with Martin on scripts including:

- The Claws of Axos (1971)
- The Mutants (1972)
- The Three Doctors (1972–1973)
- The Sontaran Experiment (1975)
- The Hand of Fear (1976)
- The Invisible Enemy (1977)
- Underworld (1978)
- The Armageddon Factor (1979)

Baker and Martin were nicknamed the Bristol Boys by the Doctor Who production teams.

Baker and Martin devised for Doctor Who the robotic dog K9 (created for The Invisible Enemy), the renegade Time Lord Omega (created for The Three Doctors, Doctor Who's 10th anniversary story) and the Axons. K-9 was originally intended to appear in one story only, but the BBC decided to make it a recurring character. Several of Baker's stories had elements of hard science not often found in Doctor Who, despite having been criticised for scientific inaccuracy. Prior to his death in 2021, Baker was the last surviving Doctor Who scriptwriter from the Third Doctor era.

Together with Martin, they also created fantasy television serials for children including Sky (1975).

Baker's other contributions to British television include Vision On animation with Laurie Booth, scripts for episodes of Shoestring and Bergerac. A new series featuring K9, K-9 created in Australia, aired in the UK and worldwide in 2009 and 2010.

Baker revealed on the DVD commentary for Nightmare of Eden that he contacted Russell T Davies about the possibility of writing for the 2005 revival of Doctor Who but was told in no uncertain terms that writers from the original series were not wanted, though K9 did appear in Doctor Who and The Sarah Jane Adventures under Russell T Davies.

In 2013, Baker wrote his autobiography entitled K9 Stole My Trousers with help from Laurie Booth. Later in 2015, he co-wrote with Paul M. Tams The Essential Book of K9 which was crowd-funded on Indiegogo.

== Personal life ==
Baker was married to Marie and had eight children and seven grandchildren. He resided in Stroud, Gloucestershire. He died on 3 November 2021, at the age of 82.

== Writing credits ==
=== Television ===
Production	Notes	Broadcaster
Doctor Who	38 episodes (1971–1979): "The Claws of Axos" (1971) "The Mutants" (1972) "The Three Doctors" (1972–1973) "The Sontaran Experiment" (1975) "The Hand of Fear" (1976) "The Invisible Enemy" (1977) "Underworld" (1978) "The Armageddon Factor" (1979) "Nightmare of Eden" (1979)	BBC1
Thick as Thieves	Television film (1971)	ITV
Pretenders	"The Last Battle" (1972) "Prizemen" (1972)	ITV
Arthur of the Britons	"People of the Plough" (1973)	ITV
Late Night Drama	"Item" (1974)	ITV
Z-Cars	"Quiet as the Grave" (1974) "House to House" (1974)	BBC1
Hunter's Walk	"Villain" (1974) "Kicking & Screaming" (1976)	ITV
Public Eye	"Lifer" (1975)	ITV
Sky	7 episodes (co-written with Dave Martin, 1975)	ITV
Machinegunner	Television film (1976)	ITV
King of the Castle	7 episodes (co-written with Dave Martin, 1977)	ITV
Follow Me…	Television miniseries (1977)	ITV
Cottage to Let	"The Last Day" (1977)	ITV
Scorpion Tales	"Killing" (1978)	ITV
Target	"Big Elephant" (1977) "Hunting Parties" (1977) "Carve Up" (1977) "Rogue's Gallery" (1978)	BBC1
Murder at the Wedding	Television miniseries (1979)	ITV
Shoestring	"Knock for Knock" (1979)	BBC1
ITV Playhouse	"Rat Trap" (1979)	ITV
Into the Labyrinth	15 episodes (1981–1982)	ITV
Jangles	"Getting It Together" (1982)	ITV
Bergerac	"Unlucky Dip" (1981) "The Moonlight Girls" (1983)	BBC1
Function Room	Television miniseries (script editor, 1985)	ITV
Call Me Mister	"The Creative Accountant" (1986)	BBC1
Succubus	Television film (1987)	ITV
The Jazz Detective	Television film (1992)	ITV
Kipper	"The Umbrella" (1997)	ITV
The Mysti Show	"Episode #1.12" (2004)	BBC One
K-9	"Mind Snap" (co written with Paul Tams, 2010) "Angel of the North" (2010)	Channel Five; Network Ten
Wallace and Gromit's World of Invention	6 episodes (2010)	BBC One

=== Short films ===
Year	Title	Notes
1993	The Wrong Trousers	Co-written with Nick Park
1995	A Close Shave	Co-written with Nick Park
2008	A Matter of Loaf and Death	Co-written with Nick Park

=== Feature films ===
Year	Title	Notes
2005	Wallace & Gromit: The Curse of the Were-Rabbit	Co-written with Steve Box, Nick Park and Mark Burton

=== Books ===
Year	Title	Notes
2013	K9 Stole My Trousers!	Autobiography
2015	The Essential Book of K9	Co-written with Paul M. Tams

== Awards and nominations ==
Year	Award	Work	Category	Result	Reference
2006	British Academy Television Awards	The Curse of the Were-Rabbit (shared with Claire Jennings, David Sproxton, Nick Park, Steve Box, and Mark Burton)	Alexander Korda Award for Best British Film	Won	
2006	Hugo Award	The Curse of the Were-Rabbit (shared with Nick Park, Steve Box, and Mark Burton)	Best Dramatic Presentation, Long Form	Nominated	
2009	British Academy Television Awards	A Matter of Loaf and Death (shared with Nick Park and Steve Pegram)	Best Short Animation	Won	
2009	Broadcasting Press Guild Awards	A Matter of Loaf and Death (shared with Nick Park and Steve Pegram)	Best Comedy/Entertainment	Nominated	
