= Katharine Levy =

British actress and television producer

- Occupations: Actor and television producer
- Years active: 1970s–present

Katharine Levy is a British actress and television producer.

As a child she appeared in a number of TV series, such as the BBC's 1974 serial David Copperfield (in the role of Little Emily) and I, Claudius (1976; as a young Livilla). Other roles include Jane Masters in The Day After Tomorrow (1975; titled "Into Infinity" when broadcast on BBC1), Sandra in Children of the Stones (1977), Lynn in Follow Me… (1977) and Mary Churchill in Winston Churchill: The Wilderness Years (1981).

As a young adult she played Hero in the 1984 BBC TV adaptation of William Shakespeare's Much Ado About Nothing and Sarah de Talmont in the ITV series Robin of Sherwood (1985). Levy later joined the Royal Shakespeare Company as part of the cast of Nicholas Nickleby on Broadway. In the UK, she has appeared as Juliet in Romeo and Juliet, Hermia in A Midsummer Night's Dream, Olivia in Twelfth Night and Kate Hardcastle in She Stoops to Conquer. In the West End, she has performed in After the Ball is Over at the Old Vic.

Levy's career has since moved away from acting and she works as an executive producer and director of business TV.
