= John Woodnutt =

English actor (1924–2006)

- Woodnutt in Doctor Who: Terror of the Zygons (1975)
- Born: John Edward Arthur Woodnutt; 3 March 1924; London, England
- Died: 2 January 2006 (aged 81); Denville Hall, Northwood, London, England
- Occupation: Actor
- Children: 5

John Edward Arthur Woodnutt (3 March 1924 – 2 January 2006) was an English actor, often cast in villainous roles.

== Early life and education ==
The younger son of Harold Frederick Woodnutt and brother of the Conservative MP Mark Woodnutt, Woodnutt was born in London, and at the age of 18 made his acting debut at the Oxford Playhouse.

== Career ==
Woodnutt had many television roles, including that of Henry VII in the first episode of The Six Wives of Henry VIII (1970); Sir Watkyn Bassett in the television series Jeeves and Wooster (1990 to 1993); and Merlin and Mogdred in the children's adventure game programme Knightmare (1987–1990). One of his earliest television roles was in 1956 in the ITV drama One, broadcast live. He appeared five times in Z-Cars and once in Softly, Softly.

Woodnutt appeared four times in the BBC science fiction television series Doctor Who:

- Spearhead from Space (1970) as Hibbert
- Frontier in Space (1973) as the Draconian Emperor
- Terror of the Zygons (1975) in the dual roles of Broton and the Duke of Forgill
- The Keeper of Traken (1981) as Seron

Woodnutt appeared in The Avengers episode "Quick-Quick Slow Death" in 1966 and played "The Spidron" in the cult science fiction series The Tomorrow People in 1973. He also appeared in the Look and Read educational serial "The Boy From Space" in 1971, as the Thin Spaceman; the BBC children's drama adaptation of The Secret Garden (1975); the 1976 HTV series Children of the Stones as the sinister butler Link; and the 1978 series The Doombolt Chase. In the 1980s, he played various roles in several television movies such as Hitler's SS: Portrait in Evil, starring Bill Nighy and John Shea. In the BBC Scotland television series of The Secret Garden, made in 1975, he played the part of Mr. Archibald Craven. He appeared in producer Barry Letts's classic serials Sense and Sensibility, Stalky & Co., and The Pickwick Papers. He played the Senior Tutor in Porterhouse Blue and also appeared briefly in the comedy sketch show Paul Merton: The Series in the early 1990s. He also appeared in an episode of The Bill, series 7, Episode 11 as Mr Cork.

Radio and television Sherlock Holmes stories in which Woodnutt appeared included the BBC Radio 4 adaptation of The Hound of the Baskervilles and, as the fussy banker Mr. Merryweather, in the series The Adventures of Sherlock Holmes with Jeremy Brett in the episode entitled The Red-Headed League. He also made an appearance in the 1965 Douglas Wilmer Sherlock Holmes series on the BBC.

Woodnutt's film credits included roles in The Scarlet Blade (1963), Man in the Middle (1964), All Neat in Black Stockings (1968), Connecting Rooms (1970), Who Dares Wins (1982), Champions (1984), Lifeforce (1985), Mack the Knife (1989) and Bullseye! (1990).

== Personal life ==
Woodnutt was married twice and had two sons and three daughters. The last part of his life was spent at Denville Hall, an actors' retirement home in Northwood.

== Filmography ==
Year	Title	Role	Notes
1960	Inn for Trouble	1st Board Member	Uncredited
1960	The Young Jacobites	Lieutenant	Serial
1962	Fog for a Killer	Blacky	Uncredited
1963	The Scarlet Blade	Lt. Wyatt	Uncredited
1964	Man in the Middle	Education Officer	
1968	Star!	Second Speaker, Hyde Park Corner	Uncredited
1969	Oh! What a Lovely War	British Officer	Uncredited
1969	All Neat in Black Stockings	Vicar	
1970	Connecting Rooms	Doctor	
1975	The Secret Garden	Mr. Archibald Craven	
1980	Lady Killers	Stuart McKinnon	
1982	Who Dares Wins	Harold Staunton	
1984	Champions	Mr. Champion	
1985	Lifeforce	Metallurgist	
1989	Mack the Knife	Reverend Kimball	
1990	Never Come Back	Sir John	
1990	Bullseye!	Bank Manager	
2000	Dragonheart: A New Beginning	Friar Peter	Final film role
