= Hugh Thomas (actor) =

Welsh actor

- Born: 1949 (age 75–76)

Hugh Thomas (born 1949) is a Welsh actor, probably best known for his appearances in several popular Welsh television series, such as Pobol y Cwm, High Hopes, and Satellite City. He has also appeared in television series outside Wales, such as Not the Nine O'Clock News and Freud, as well as several films, including if...., The Tall Guy, and Breaking Glass.

== Filmography ==
Year	Title	Role	Notes
1968	if....	Denson: Whips	
1973	O Lucky Man!	Coffee Salesman / Pickpocket	
1977	Raven		
1980	Rough Cut	Male Guest	
1980	Breaking Glass	Davis	
1982	Mr. Kershaw's Dream System		BT Sales film for Monarch
1989	The Tall Guy	Dr. Karabekian	
1993, 1995, 1997–1999, 2018–	Pobol y Cwm	Iori Davies	Series regular
2019	The Crown	Bishop of Llandaff	Season 3, episode 1 "Aberfan"
