= Bright's Boffins =

British children's TV series (1970–1972)

Bright's Boffins is a British children's television comedy about a team of eccentric inventors working for the British Government. It starred Alexander Doré as Group Captain Bertram Bright (referred to as "The Groupie" by his colleagues), "the hair-brained leader of a department for designing inventions that was so hush-hush even the Government had forgotten about it". It also starred Gordon Rollings and Avril Angers. It was written by Denis Goodwin, produced by Southern Television and aired between 1970 and 1972. All 39 episodes are missing, believed lost.
