= An Enemy of the State =

1965 British BBC TV series

An Enemy of the State is a 1965 British TV series. Originally shown on BBC Two, it was written by Ken Hughes and directed by James Cellan Jones. It focused on an electrical engineer who travelled to Moscow on business, and ended up on trial for his life when he was accused of espionage.

It ran for 6 episodes of 25 minutes.

== Cast ==
- Charles Tingwell as Harry Sutton
- James Maxwell as Col. Rykov
- Veronica Strong as Jennifer Sutton
- Steven Berkoff as Defence Counsel
