= Virgin of the Secret Service =

- Created by: Ted Willis
- Starring: Clinton Greyn; Veronica Strong; John Cater; Alexander Doré; Noel Coleman
- Country of origin: United Kingdom
- No. of series: 1
- No. of episodes: 13

Production
- Producer: ATV
- Running time: 50 minutes

Original release
- Network: ITV
- Release: 28 March – 20 June 1968

Virgin of the Secret Service is a British television series which ran for one season in 1968, produced by the ITV franchise, Associated Television. The series was created by Ted Willis.

The show was a tongue-in-cheek adventure series set in the early 1900s, and followed the adventures of Captain Robert Virgin (Clinton Greyn), a gentleman officer working for the British Secret Service. Each episode would see him dispatched to different parts of the world by Colonel Shaw-Camberley (Noel Coleman) to do battle with enemies of the British Empire. He was aided by his escapologist batman Sergeant Doublett (John Cater) and Mrs. Cortez (Veronica Strong), an emancipated female photographer and part-time secret agent. Virgin's principal adversary was always Karl Von Brauner (Alexander Doré) – a German spy who would always be dreaming up "a plan of the utmost simplicity" with which to take down the Empire and the Secret Service.

The series was released on DVD by Network on 1 April 2013.

== Recurring cast ==
- Captain Robert Virgin - Clinton Greyn
- Mrs. Virginia Cortez - Veronica Strong
- Sergeant Fred Doublett - John Cater
- Karl Von Brauner - Alexander Doré
- Colonel Shaw-Camberley - Noel Coleman
- Klaus Striebeck - Peter Swanwick

== Episode list ==
Episode no.	Title	First transmission (UK)	Director	Writer
1	"Dark Deeds on the Northwest Frontier"	28 March 1968	Paul Bernard	Nicholas Palmer
2	"Russian Roundabout"	4 April 1968	John Sichel	Basil Dawson
3	"Entente Cordiale"	11 April 1968	Paul Bernard	Betty Lambda
4	"The Great Ring of Akba"	18 April 1968	Paul Bernard	Ted Willis
5	"The Amazons"	25 April 1968	Robert D. Cardona	Basil Dawson
6	"The Rajah and the Suffragette"	2 May 1968	John Sichel	Anthony Steven & Vincent Tilsley
7	"Persuasion of a Million Drops"	9 May 1968	Robert D. Cardona	Ted Willis
8	"Pride of Assassins"	16 May 1968	Paul Bernard	Anthony Steven
9	"Across the Silver Pass of Gusri Song"	23 May 1968	Josephine Douglas	Ted Willis
10	"The Pyramid Plot"	30 May 1968	Robert D. Cardona	Basil Dawson
11	"A Fate Worse Than Death"	6 June 1968	Heinrich Hirsch	Stuart Douglas
12	"The Professor Goes West"	13 June 1968	Robert D. Cardona	Nicholas Palmer
13	"Wings Over Glencraig"	20 June 1968	Robert D. Cardona	John Roberts
