= Sky (1975 serial) =

1975 British children's TV fantasy series

- Genre: Sci-Fi; Supernatural drama Children's
- Written by: Bob Baker; Dave Martin
- Country of origin: United Kingdom
- Original language: English
- No. of series: 1
- No. of episodes: 7

Production
- Running time: 25 minutes per episode
- Production company: HTV West

Original release
- Network: ITV
- Release: 7 April – 19 May 1975

Sky is a mystically oriented children's science fantasy television serial made for ITV by HTV and broadcast in seven parts from 7 April to 19 May 1975.

A mysterious alien boy with strange solid blue eyes named Sky (Marc Harrison) finds himself on Earth in the wrong period of time. He uses his psychic powers to achieve his goal of finding a way to his correct temporal destination, which is after "The Chaos". Sky is confronted by the world soul of Earth in the form of Nature, which tries to reject him much as an immune system might an infection. In his quest to reach the time he was intended for, Sky is assisted by three human children. The serial was written by Bob Baker and Dave Martin, also known for their scripts for the BBC sci-fi series Doctor Who and the HTV West children's fantasy drama series Into the Labyrinth.

Although the series was kept on 2" videotape into the 1990s, during a transfer to film stock episodes 3 and 7 were damaged beyond repair. The series was finally released by Network Distributing Home Entertainment/Granada Ventures Ltd in May 2009, with the damaged segments replaced by inferior, but watchable, VHS copies of the episodes.

== Episodes ==
1. "Burning Bright" (7 April 1975)
2. "Juganet" (14 April 1975)
3. "Goodchild" (21 April 1975)
4. "What Dread Hand" (28 April 1975)
5. "Evalake" (5 May 1975)
6. "Life Force" (12 May 1975)
7. "Chariot of Fire" (19 May 1975)

== Credits ==
Cast

- Marc Harrison (Sky)
- Stuart Lock (Arby Vennor)
- Cherrald Butterfield (Jane Vennor)
- Richard Speight (Roy Briggs)
- Robert Eddison (Goodchild)
- Jack Watson (Major Briggs)
- Frances Cuka (Mrs. Vennor)
- Meredith Edwards (Tom)
- Thomas Heathcote (Mr. Vennor)
- Gerard Hely (Dr. Saul)
- Ursula Barclay (First Nurse)
- Monica Lavers (Second Nurse)
- Bernard Archard (Haril)
- Trevor Ray (Rex)
- Peter Copley (Revil)
- John Curry (Policeman)
- Prunella Ransome (Susannah)
- David Jackson (Sergeant Simmons)
- Sean Lynch (Michael)
- Rex Holdsworth (Dr. Marshall)
- Barbara Baber (Receptionist)
- Geoff Searle (Orderly)

Production

- Patrick Dromgoole (Executive producer, Director episodes 1, 2)
- Leonard White (Producer, Director episode 6)
- Derek Clark (Director episodes 4, 7)
- Terry Harding (Director episodes 3, 5)
- Bob Baker (Writer)
- Dave Martin (Writer)
- Eric Wetherell (Music)

== Novelisation ==
In 2015, Baker wrote a novelisation of Sky, which was published by Fantom Films Books.

== Audio Revival ==
In 2025, Big Finish Productions secured the license to revive Sky as an audio series set fifty years later, with Cloud Quinn in the title role and Edwin Flay as Arby. The first series was released in August 2025 and a second series followed in June 2026.
