= Alexander Doré =

British actor, director and screenwriter (1923–2002)

- Alexander Doré as the First Spy in Chitty Chitty Bang Bang (1968)
- Born: 28 August 1923; Hampstead, London, England
- Died: 16 April 2002 (aged 78); London, England
- Occupations: Actor, director, screenwriter
- Years active: 1946–1988
- Spouse: Edna Gorring (m. 1946)
- Children: 1

Alexander Joseph Doré (28 August 1923 – 16 April 2002) was a British actor, director and screenwriter. He was best known for his appearance as the First Spy in the 1968 film Chitty Chitty Bang Bang. He also co-starred in the 1968 TV series Virgin of the Secret Service (as villain Karl Von Brauner) as well as playing Bertram Bright in Bright's Boffins (1970-1972).

Doré's other screen appearances include At the Stroke of Nine (1957), Tales from Dickens (1958), ITV Television Playhouse (1958), Emergency-Ward 10 (1960), Dixon of Dock Green (1964), Casino Royale (1967), ITV Playhouse (1968), and A Very Peculiar Practice (1986).

His credits as a screenwriter include Jungle Street (1961) and The Wind of Change (1961), while his directing credits include Hé... mag ik mĳn echtgenote terug? (1975), Boem-Boem (1982) and Privé Voor Twee (1988) for Dutch television.

He directed the plays See How They Run at London's Vaudeville Theatre, The Sunday Man at the Morosco Theatre on Broadway in 1964, and the world premiere of We Who Are About To... (with Anton Rodgers) in 1968 at the Hampstead Theatre Club. In 1988 he directed the Dutch-language version of the play Never Judge a Book by Its Cover which undertook a successful fifty-city tour of the Netherlands and Belgium.

== Personal life ==
Doré married actress Edna Gorring in 1946 in Pancras, London, and the two of them ran their own company for five years at the Little Theatre in Aberystwyth. They had a son, Michael. Alexander Doré died in London in 2002, aged 78.

== Selected filmography ==
- At the Stroke of Nine (1957) – Carter
- The Ugly Duckling (1959) – Shop Customer
- Casino Royale (1967) – Extra (uncredited)
- Chitty Chitty Bang Bang (1968) – First Spy
- Ik ben Joep Meloen (1981) – Drunken man
