= The Clifton House Mystery =

1978 British children's TV series

- Genre: Supernatural drama Children's
- Created by: Leonard White
- Written by: Daniel Farson; Harry Moore
- Starring: Sebastian Breaks; Ingrid Hafner; Peter Sallis
- Theme music composer: Sidney Sager
- Country of origin: United Kingdom
- Original language: English
- No. of series: 1
- No. of episodes: 6

Production
- Producer: Patrick Dromgoole
- Running time: 30 minutes per episode
- Production company: HTV West

Original release
- Network: ITV
- Release: 8 October – 12 November 1978

The Clifton House Mystery is a British children's supernatural drama miniseries written by Daniel Farson and Harry Moore, broadcast from 8 October to 12 November 1978 by HTV for ITV.

== Plot ==
Conductor Timothy Clare and his family – wife, daughter and two sons – move into an old house in Bristol they had just bought from the elderly Mrs Betterton; the house having been in her family for generations. While exploring the garden, Timothy's two sons notice that the house has an extra window, and deduce that a hidden room may exist. After breaking through an upstairs wall and discovering an ancient dusty bedroom, a long-dead skeleton is found in the four-poster bed.

A number of strange incidents then start to occur. The Clares' daughter Jenny is visited by the ghost of a kindly old woman who appears to be summoned by a music box left behind by Mrs Betterton's granddaughter. Plates and bowls jump out of people's hands and smash to the ground. A dragoon's helmet that the boys had bought at Mrs Betterton's contents auction starts to glow mysteriously; and a blood-like liquid drips through the ceiling onto some dinner party guests.

After these unexplained incidents, the boys recruit a local ghost hunter called Milton Guest to investigate. After hearing what has happened, Guest becomes convinced that a ghost connected in some way with the Bristol Riots of 1831 is haunting the house. After checking local records, they realize that it may be the ghost of a dragoon commander called George Bretherton who was court-martialled for his lenient handling of the rioters, and who subsequently disappeared without trace.

Although she confirms that the house would have been in her family's possession at the time of the riots, Mrs Betterton claims to have been unaware of the secret room, or any family connection to the riots in 1831. She does mention that there was a 'family scandal' sometime in that era, but she was never told the details. Guest suspects that she is a direct descendant of Bretherton, the family name having been changed as a consequence of the 'scandal'.

Guest performs an exorcism that appears successful at first. The helmet stops glowing and the ghost of the old lady – apparently the dragoon's mother – is no longer seen; the music box which summoned her ceases to function and all returns to normal. However in the final episode, after authorities remove the skeleton and give it a Christian burial, the phenomena start to occur again...

=== Subplot ===
The story of the Dragoon commander is based on the real-life case of Thomas Brereton, a Lieutenant-Colonel in the Dragoons stationed in Bristol in the 1830s when riots broke out following the failure in the House of Lords of the Reform Bill. Ordered to suppress the rioters with whatever means necessary, Brereton was court-martialled for leniency when he refused to fire on the rioters, resorting only to a cavalry charge when negotiations failed. He committed suicide by shooting himself before the trial reached a verdict.

== Main characters ==
- Timothy Clare (Sebastian Breaks) Conductor of the Bristol Chamber Orchestra who moves with his wife and three children into an old house in Bristol.
- Sheila Clare (Ingrid Hafner) Timothy's wife who becomes slowly convinced that the strange occurrences may be paranormal.
- Milton Guest (Peter Sallis) A ghost hunter whom the Clares' sons' invite to explore the strange phenomena, and who performs an apparently successful exorcism.
- Emily Betterton (Michelle Martin) Granddaughter possessed by the ghost who she conjours through a musical box

== Home media ==
The Clifton House Mystery was released on Region 2 DVD in 2010 by Network.
