= Trevor Ray =

British actor, writer, and script editor (died 2019)

- Born: Trevor W P Ray; 1934; Westminster, England
- Died: 24 November 2019 (aged 84–85); Suffolk, England
- Occupations: Actor, writer, scriptwriter

Trevor Ray (1934 – 24 November 2019) was a British actor, writer and script editor. As a writer and script editor he worked on series such as Doctor Who, Paul Temple and Children of the Stones.

== Writing ==
Ray authored the final draft of Episode 1 of David Whitaker's much-rewritten Doctor Who serial The Ambassadors of Death (1970), but Whitaker received the sole credit on screen. He was an uncredited assistant script editor on the programme from The Invasion (1968) to Spearhead from Space (1970).

In October 1969, Ray joined former Doctor Who producers Peter Bryant and Derrick Sherwin to work on revamping another BBC series, Paul Temple.

Along with Jeremy Burnham, Ray co-wrote the children's fantasy television serial Children of the Stones (1977) for HTV. With Burnham, he also wrote the serial's novelization, published in the same year. With Burnham, he co-wrote a five episode children's serial entitled Raven (1977), as well as its novelization (1977). (A sequel to Children of the Stones, titled Return to the Stones, written by Jeremy Burnham, appeared first as an e-book in 2012 and then as a physical book in 2015.)

== Acting ==
While working as script editor Terrance Dicks' assistant on Doctor Who in 1969, he also appeared on screen playing a ticket inspector in Doctor Who and the Silurians.

Ray appeared in Emmerdale Farm from 1972 to 1973 as Bart Ansett, a friend of Jack Sugden and again in 1986 as Robin Parr.

In 1986, Ray starred in a BBC Scotland adaptation of Gawn Grainger's play Four to One along with Mark McManus, Derek Newark and Derrick O'Connor.

== Filmography ==
Year	Title	Role	Notes
1969	Lock Up Your Daughters	Quill	
1972	Rentadick	Rivet	
1987	The Sicilian	Frisella, the barber	
1987	Little Dorrit	Magnate from the City	
2004	Ladies in Lavender	Very Old Man 1	(final film role)
