= Into the Labyrinth (TV series) =

- Genre: Fantasy
- Written by: Bob Baker; Peter Graham Scott; Ivan Benbrook; Robert Holmes; Ray Jenkins; John Lucarotti; Andrew Payne; Anthony Read; Gary Hopkins
- Directed by: Peter Graham Scott, Alex Kirby, Ken Price
- Starring: Pamela Salem; Simon Beal (aka Charlie Caine); Ron Moody; Lisa Turner; Simon Henderson; Chris Harris
- Composer: Sidney Sager
- Country of origin: United Kingdom
- Original language: English
- No. of series: 3
- No. of episodes: 21

Production
- Executive producer: Patrick Dromgoole
- Producer: Peter Graham Scott
- Production locations: Cheddar Gorge, Somerset, England, United Kingdom
- Running time: 30 minutes
- Production company: HTV West

Original release
- Network: ITV
- Release: 13 May 1981 – 8 September 1982

Into the Labyrinth is a British children's television series. It was produced by HTV for the ITV network between 1980 and 1982, with the first series being broadcast in May 1981. Three seasons, each consisting of seven 25-minute episodes, were produced by Peter Graham Scott, who also directed all but two episodes, both in the final season. The series was created by Scott along with Bob Baker, who had previously written several stories for Doctor Who.

The first series only was later shown in the United States as part of "The Third Eye" science fiction series on Nickelodeon. It was also broadcast on ABC TV in Australia, TVE in Spain, RTÉ One and RTÉ Two as part of The Den in Ireland, ETB 1 and ETB 2 in Basque Country, Arutz HaYeladim in Israel, TV2 in Malaysia and both RTV and ATV in Hong Kong. The series also reran on British satellite television and aired on The Children's Channel as part of one of its wrapper programmes Roustabout.

== Synopsis ==
The series was based around a struggle between two timeless, feuding sorcerers - the noble Rothgo (Ron Moody) and the evil Belor (Pamela Salem). Each aimed to obtain possession of the Nidus, a magical object of limitless power. The Nidus actually belonged to Rothgo, but it was stolen by Belor who used her own magic to send it through time and space so that Rothgo would not be able to find it. Without the power of the Nidus, Rothgo would ultimately die. The first series followed a group of modern-day children (Phil, Helen and Terry) who find Rothgo, almost lifeless, in a labyrinthine cave. Rothgo sends the children through different periods of time to search for the Nidus, which is disguised as a different object in each time period and can only be seen in reflection. The children arrive in various settings in history or ancient mythology (the French Revolution, Ancient Greece, English Civil War, etc.), in which they find an earlier version of Rothgo himself, playing a character from each period. Together they search for the Nidus, but their attempts are constantly thwarted by Belor who also appears in each time period, disguised as a character herself. Just as the children are about to retrieve the Nidus, Belor uses her magic to hurl it further through time and space by using her magical incantation "I deny you the Nidus!" as a bolt of lightning emanates from her fingertips. Belor cannot actually touch the Nidus whilst Rothgo still lives, and so she can only hope to deny him possession of the artefact until he eventually dies. At the end of the first series, the children locate the Nidus (now in the shape of a sword) and finally manage to outwit Belor and return the Nidus to Rothgo, who offered to share its power with Belor. She refused and was reduced to a lifeless skull.

In the second series, Belor returns with her own power source, the Albedo, with which she hopes to destroy Rothgo and take possession of the Nidus. However, during their battle, the two power sources collide leaving the Albedo destroyed and the Nidus split into five segments which scatter throughout time and space. As before, Rothgo enlists the help of Phil, Terry and Helen to retrieve the fragments which are again disguised as objects and can only be seen in reflection. However, this time there are two factors in their favour—Rothgo's other incarnations in time can recognize the children immediately and Rothgo himself is capable of claiming the Nidus fragments before Belor can send them into another time period (using his magical incantation "I claim the Nidus!"). Their efforts are yet again hampered by Belor, until the final episode of the second series, when the children manage to reconstitute the Nidus into its former shape of a sword. However, this time they are unable to escape Belor and so Phil hurls the Nidus into a bottomless pool of water. Bereft of both the Nidus and the Albedo, Belor reverts into a lifeless skull once again. Fortunately however, Rothgo explains that even though the Nidus is no longer in his sole possession, it was thrown into the Waters of Time where he (and anyone else seeking enlightenment) can tap into its power whenever he desires to sustain his immortality and travel freely through time once again.

In the third and final series, only Phil returned to assist a new sorcerer, Lazlo (played by Chris Harris). Lazlo's source of power was the Scarabeus, a magical amulet that fitted onto a bracelet he wore. Although now no longer able to possess the Nidus (which was lost at the end of the previous series), Belor rises yet again and attempts to steal Lazlo's Scarabeus by once again hiding it from him in different historical settings. This time, the time periods are populated by fictional characters who have come to life (Long John Silver, Dr. Jekyll and Mr. Hyde, The Phantom of the Opera, etc). Belor also enlists her own accomplice, the often incompetent Bram (Howard Goorney). Lazlo and Phil try to trace the Scarabeus using the bracelet, but they are constantly thwarted by Belor until the final episode when they are victorious and Lazlo vanquishes her.

== Behind the scenes ==
Some of the Labyrinth scenes were shot on location in the Cheddar Gorge caves. These provided the opening and closing scenes of season one, and footage used as CSO backdrops. Most of the historical escapades were studio based around the same cave sets, which were redressed for each time period. The opening and closing book ends for seasons two and three were shot at Stanton Drew stone circles and Glastonbury Tor, respectively.

Several scriptwriters for the series had previously worked on Doctor Who, including co-creator Bob Baker, Robert Holmes, Anthony Read and John Lucarotti.

The operatic voice that sings the haunting theme of Into the Labyrinth is Lynda Richardson, who also sings the main melody line of theme to the 1970s fantasy series Children of the Stones. Patrick Dromgoole was the executive producer and Sidney Sager wrote the music for both of these series.

The three child actors continued acting as adults. Simon Beal now acts under the stage name Charlie Caine, and had a small role in Bridget Jones's Diary. Lisa Turner had a role in the UK drama Bad Girls, while Simon Henderson played Eddie Hunter in EastEnders.

Pamela Salem based the laugh she used for Belor on the laugh of Ted Rhodes, who was the script editor for the BBC's All Creatures Great and Small television series. Salem appeared in several episodes as Zoe Bennett.

== Novelisations ==
The first and second series were novelised by Peter Graham Scott, titled Into The Labyrinth and Return To The Labyrinth respectively.

== Home media ==
The first series was released on VHS (on two cassettes) in the late 1980s. Network released the entire series as a three disc DVD boxset in the UK on 14 July 2008. It was encoded for Region 2 and includes photo galleries as extra features.

== Cast ==
- Rothgo (Series 1-2, 1981): Ron Moody
- Belor: Pamela Salem
- Phil : Simon Beal
- Helen (Series 1-2, 1981): Lisa Turner
- Terry (Series 1-2, 1981): Simon Henderson
- Lazlo (Series 3, 1982): Chris Harris
- Bram (Series 3, 1982): Howard Goorney
