= Patrick Dromgoole =

British film and television producer and television executive

- Born: 30 August 1930; Iquique, Chile
- Died: 7 September 2026 (aged 96)
- Education: Dulwich College; University College, Oxford (1951–1954)
- Occupations: Television producer and executive
- Employer(s): BBC (1954–1963); HTV (1969–1996)

Patrick Dromgoole (30 August 1930 – 7 September 2026) was a British film and television producer and television executive. As programme director with HTV he brought many children's suspense and mystery programmes to British television in the 1970s and 1980s. He won an Emmy Award in 1985 as executive director of an episode of the American Playhouse anthology, Displaced Person.

== Early life ==
Dromgoole was born in Iquique, Chile, in 1930, younger brother of Nicholas Dromgoole. His parents were Nicholas Arthur Dromgoole, a telegraphist with the British Civil Service, and Violet Brookes.

At the age of 10, Dromgoole saw a performance of a Shakespeare play in Garnant, Carmarthenshire, by the Old Vic touring company. The Old Vic had relocated to Burnley, because of the war, and toured to both South Wales and the north of England in 1940 and 1941. Dromgoole, who was a wartime evacuee in Wales, described that performance as the moment that he knew that he "wanted to be a part of the theatre".

Dromgoole went to school at Dulwich College, and in 1951 went to University College, Oxford for his undergraduate studies.

== Career ==
Dromgoole was involved in student theatre while at Oxford, and went on to have a career in theatre, television and film.

In 1953, he appeared alongside Maggie Smith in a performance of He Who Gets Slapped by Leonid Andreyev, directed by Peter Bayley for the Univ Players. Smith was at that time a pupil at the theatre school in Oxford; Bayley was a tutor in English at University College.

He joined the BBC in 1954, where he worked as a producer and director. From 1963, he began work as a freelance theatre, film and television director.

In 1964, Dromgoole directed Joe Orton's first play, Entertaining Mr Sloane when it opened at the New Arts Theatre Club in London in May of that year, and also when it transferred to Wyndham's Theatre later that summer. That same year, Dromgoole featured in a 1964 documentary series about the city of Bristol, created by John Boorman to help launch the BBC2 television channel.

In 1969, he joined the West of England and Wales television station, Harlech Television (HTV), as a programme controller; and was later promoted to managing director (1987) and chief executive of the HTV group in 1988.

Dromgoole served as the vice-chair of the Royal Television Society, from 1971 to 1972.

As programme director at HTV he helped to bring to the public many shows for daytime and children's television in the 1970s and 1980s, including Arthur of the Britons (1972–3), Children of the Stones (1977), and the miniseries Kidnapped (1978), along with adaptations of Jamaica Inn, starring Patrick MacGoohan, in 1983, and Robin Of Sherwood. Under his leadership, HTV became recognised as "the undisputed champion of regional television weirdness" in children's programming of the 1970s.

Dromgoole's last production credit was in 1996. He retired to Penkill Castle in Ayrshire, which he had purchased in 1993.

In 2011, he starred in an episode of the Channel 4 series Come Dine with Me, where he was tagged as Patrick, the "castle-dwelling food snob".

== Opium-eating hoax ==
In 1952, an Oxford undergraduate student society ‘The Heretics Club’ hosted a talk by a guest speaker who was introduced as a Turkish scholar and sociologist called Dr Mahesh Helai. His topic was "The Pleasure of Opium Eating". News of the talk was reported in London newspapers the next day, before it was discovered that the whole event was an elaborate hoax. Helai was actually Dromgoole, at that time an undergraduate member of the Oxford University Dramatic Society, who had been made up professionally for the event. The story was published in Time magazine.

== Family ==
Dromgoole was married twice; first to Jenny Davis, and then, in 1991, to June Morrow. Two of his children, Jessica Dromgoole and Dominic Dromgoole went on to have careers in theatre. Dromgoole died in September 2026, at the age of 96.
