= Jeremy Burnham =

British actor (1931–2020)

John Richard Jeremy Burnham (28 May 1931 – 31 December 2020) was a British theatre and television actor from the 1950s until the 1970s, and a screenwriter.

== Life and career ==
Burnham trained at the Old Vic Theatre School, in the early 1950s and appeared in many popular British TV series such as The Avengers episodes "The Fear Merchants", "The Town of No Return", and "The Forget-Me-Knot", The Saint and Randall and Hopkirk (Deceased) in 1969.

In 1970, he co-wrote The Horror of Frankenstein with Jimmy Sangster for Hammer Films, a semi-parody, semi-remake of The Curse of Frankenstein. Burnham also went on to write The Thirteenth Reunion for the TV series Hammer House of Horror in 1980 and the episode Czech Mate from the Hammer House of Mystery & Suspense series in 1984.

In the mid-1970s he retired from acting and concentrated on screenwriting. With Trevor Ray, he co-authored the fondly-remembered children's science fiction horror serial Children of the Stones (1977). A novelization followed, also in 1977. A sequel novel, Return to the Stones appeared in 2012 as an e-book and in 2015 as a physical book. Ray and Burnham collaborated on a less well-known children's five episode serial entitled Raven (1977); they also wrote the novelization (1977).

He also authored the children's tennis-based novel, Break Point, which was made into a BBC television series in 1982. Burnham himself played the leading role of tennis coach Frank Abbott.

Burnham also wrote for The Avengers, in which he had also appeared as an actor (see entry above), Minder and Peak Practice.

He died in December 2020 at the age of 89.

== Selected acting credits ==
- The Birthday Present (1957)
- Yangtse Incident: The Story of H.M.S. Amethyst (1957)
- The Good Companions (1957)
- Bonjour Tristesse (1958)
- Law and Disorder (1958)
- Bachelor of Hearts (1958)
- Upstairs and Downstairs (1959)
- I Could Go On Singing (1963)
- Torpedo Bay (1963)
- The System (1964)
- The Brigand of Kandahar (1965)
