= Dave Martin (screenwriter) =

English television and film writer

David Martin
- Born: David Ralph Martin; 1 January 1935; Handsworth, Birmingham, Warwickshire, England
- Died: 30 March 2007 (aged 72); Bridport, Dorset, England
- Occupation: Writer
- Spouse: Celia Constanduros (m. 1967)
- Children: 3

David Ralph Martin (1 January 1935 – 30 March 2007) was an English television and film writer. He was born in Handsworth, Birmingham, England, and attended Handsworth Grammar School.

== Doctor Who ==
David contributed numerous scripts for the Doctor Who television series between 1971 and 1979 including:

- The Claws of Axos (1971)
- The Mutants (1972)
- The Three Doctors (1973)
- The Sontaran Experiment (1975)
- The Hand of Fear (1976)
- The Invisible Enemy (1977)
- Underworld (1978)
- The Armageddon Factor (1979)

For all of these, Martin collaborated with Bob Baker. Together they were nicknamed "The Bristol Boys" by the Doctor Who production teams with whom they worked.

Baker and Martin's most notable contributions to the Doctor Who mythos were the robotic hound K-9 (created for The Invisible Enemy) and the renegade Time Lord Omega (created for The Three Doctors, Doctor Who's tenth anniversary story).

They also worked together on the 1975 children's science fantasy television serial Sky, Into the Labyrinth and The Honey Siege.

In 1986, he wrote the Doctor Who Make Your Own Adventure book Search for the Doctor.

== Death ==
At the beginning of 2007 Martin, a smoker, was diagnosed with lung cancer; he died of the disease in March. He and his wife Celia (née Constanduros, born 1944), had two children, Leo and Thea; he also had a daughter, Anna, from his first marriage.
