= List of supplementary Doctor Who episodes =

Doctor Who is a British science fiction television programme produced by the BBC. The show has been a large influence in the media since its inception in 1963. Running parallel to its parenting seasons and series lie miscellaneous television broadcasts, home video "exclusive" releases, web broadcasts and theatrical films. These could be animations, mini-episodes, promotional scenes or charity specials.

This list only includes televised, online or home released episodes that are official or officially licensed by the BBC. Therefore audio, video game or stay plays are not included. Though games with live action scenes are allowed. The Doctor cameoing in other shows such as Extras or Family Guy are excluded, however mini-episodes airing in telethons or factual shows are included. Sketches with actors playing themselves are also excluded for better accuracy.

== Doctor Who supplementary stories ==
There have been several special Doctor Who episodes and serials that are produced by the BBC. Below they are separated into the four periods of the show; the classic era, the wilderness era, the revival era and the Bad Wolf era.

=== Classic era (1963–1989) ===
Many Doctor Who supplementary episodes existed during the classic era of the show. These include mini-episodes and films.

Title	Episodes	Directed by	Written by	Original release date
Films
Dr. Who and the Daleks	1 film, 90 minutes	Gordon Flemyng	Milton Subotsky	25 June 1965
First of the films with Peter Cushing as Dr. Who. Also starred Roberta Tovey as Susie and Roy Castle as Ian.
Daleks' Invasion Earth 2150 A.D.	1 film, 90 minutes	Gordon Flemyng	Milton Subotsky and David Whittaker	26 July 1966
Second of the films with Peter Cushing as Dr. Who. Also starred Roberta Tovey as Susie and Bernard Cribbins as Tom Campbell.
Season 5
"The Web of Fear advisory scene" For The Web of Fear	1 scene	N/A	N/A	27 January 1968
A special scene aired after The Enemy of the World episode six. It starred Patrick Troughton as the Doctor. Only the audio survives, but the scene was reconstructed with animation by the BBC in 2021.
Season 13
"Disney Time special"	1 episode	N/A	Unknown	25 August 1975
Special crossover episode featuring Tom Baker as the Doctor that aired during Disney Time. These links would have been aired between films. The ending of the story features the Doctor being urgently called away to respond to a call from the Brigadier which leads straight into Terror of the Zygons.
Season 16
"Dr. Who for Keep Australia Beautiful"	4 scenes	N/A	N/A	February 1979
Tom Baker plays the Doctor in four mini-episodes. They were broadcast exclusively to raise awareness of keeping Australia's streets tidy.
Season 17
"Animal Magic special"	1 episode, 3 minutes	N/A	Unknown	1 May 1979
Special mini-episode with Tom Baker as the Doctor broadcast within the series Animal Magic. This was filmed on the set of The Creature from the Pit.
"Season 17 prelude" For Season 17	1 scene, 2 minutes	N/A	N/A	August 1979
Tom Baker features in a promotional mini-scene, in place of a usual trailer, made to promote Season 17. It led directly into Destiny of the Daleks. It also attempted to fit into the main narrative. After a voice told the Doctor the Daleks are back, it then erased the Doctor's mind to avoid continuity issues with the next serial.
"Step into the 80s!"	2 parts	N/A	Tom Baker	January 1979
Tom Baker and Lalla Ward star as the Doctor and Romana in two promotional mini-episodes made to promote Prime Computer. They were set in or around the TARDIS.
Season 18
"On Through the 80s!"	2 parts	N/A	Tom Baker	April 1981
Tom Baker and Lalla Ward star as the Doctor, now with his burgundy outfit, and Romana in two more promotional mini-episodes made to promote Prime Computer. They were set in or around the TARDIS.
Season 22
"A Fix with Sontarans"	1 episode, 10 minutes	Marcus Mortimer	Eric Saward	23 February 1985
Special mini-episode featuring Colin Baker as the Doctor. Made for a young fan, however the story is now absent from new pressings of The Two Doctors DVD due to the crimes of presenter Jimmy Savile. The story was released on the Season 22 Blu-Ray release, but with the end outro cut and featured a new scene recorded by Colin Baker.
Season 25
"25"	1 scene, 30 seconds	N/A	N/A	September 1988
Sylvester McCoy and Sophie Aldred feature in a short promotional prequel scene to the 25th anniversary story Silver Nemesis.

=== Wilderness era (1990–2003) ===
Doctor Who supplementary stories existed during the wilderness era of the show where regular broadcast episodes did not exist. These include mini-episodes, animated stories and charity specials. They were broadcast sporadically through the 14 year period, but often featured actors from the classic era reprising their roles.

Title	Episodes	Directed by	Written by	Original release date
"Search Out Space"	1 episode, 20 minutes	Berry-Anne Billingsley	Lambros Atteshlis and Berry-Anne Billingsley	21 November 1990
A one-off piece of fiction broadcast on BBC2 with the usually non-fiction children's education programme Search Out Science. It was a Doctor Who crossover featuring Sylvester McCoy as the Doctor, Sophie Aldred as Ace, Stephen Johnson as Cedric and John Leeson as K-9.
Dimensions in Time	2 episodes, 15 minutes	Stuart MacDonald	John Nathan-Turner and David Roden	26 – 27 November 1993
A thirtieth anniversary programme of Doctor Who for Children in Need. The special was also a crossover with EastEnders. It featured Jon Pertwee, Tom Baker, Peter Davison, Colin Baker and Sylvester McCoy as the Doctor plus many of the companions. Kate O'Mara makes her final televised appearance as the Rani.
"Time is Everything"	8 scenes	John Toon	N/A	10 February 1997
Tom Baker returns to the role of the Doctor in a set of scenes aired to promote New Zealand superannuation. The scenes featured a new especially built TARDIS interior and sonic screwdriver.
Destiny of the Doctors	1 interactive story	Nick Holden	Terrance Dicks, Gary Russell, Andy Russell and Hannah Reddler	5 December 1997
A video game crossed with an episode of the show. The game featured live action scenes with Anthony Ainley as the Master.
The Curse of Fatal Death	4 episodes, 23 minutes	John Henderson	Steven Moffat	12 March 1999
A Comic Relief special, starring Rowan Atkinson, Richard E. Grant, Jim Broadbent, Hugh Grant, and Joanna Lumley as the Doctor, and Jonathan Pryce as the Master. Described by writer Steven Moffat, in DWM510, as a non-parodical comedy aimed to slot into the end of the then-continuity.
Doctor Who Night	1 broadcast	Michael Wadding	Michael Wadding	13 November 1999
Special broadcast featuring new scenes with Tom Baker with the TARDIS, introducing episodes and special features.
BBCi Specials
Death Comes to Time	5 episodes	Dan Freedman	Colin Meek and Nev Fountain	13 July 2001 - 3 May 2002
Animated serial released on the Doctor Who website, it starred Sylvester McCoy as the Seventh Doctor, Sophie Aldred as Ace and Stephen Fry as the Minister of Chance.
Real Time From Big Finish Productions as part of The Sixth Doctor Adventures	6 episodes	Gary Russell	Gary Russell	2 August 2002 - 6 September 2002
A webcast featuring Colin Baker as the Sixth Doctor and Maggie Stables as Evelyn Smythe. It also featured the Cybermen.
The Return to Shada	6 episodes	Nicholas Pegg	Douglas Adams and Gary Russell	2 May 2003 - 6 June 2003
Another special webcast featuring Paul McGann as the Eighth Doctor and Lalla Ward as Romana with John Leeson as K9. It was renamed from Shada to The Return to Shada on the 2017 Blu-Ray.
Scream of the Shalka	6 episodes	Wilson Milam	Paul Cornell	13 November 2003 - 18 December 2003
A fully animated special webcast featuring Richard E. Grant as the Doctor and Derek Jacobi as the Master. It celebrated the fortieth anniversary of Doctor Who and was an attempt at reviving the series properly.

=== Revival era (2005–present) ===
==== Standalone ====
Many standalone Doctor Who supplementary episodes existed during the revived era of the show. These include mini-episodes, animated stories and charity specials. They are all usually released as supplementary to a series.

Additionally throughout the sixth and seventh series several prequels were released online, which acted as openers for their accompanying episodes. All "prequels" were usually released ahead of their accompanying episodes. The concept is similar to that of the second series, in which each episode had an accompanying Tardisode.

The stories are segmented into the series they were released with.

Title	Episodes	Directed by	Written by	Original release date
Series 2
"Doctor Who: Children in Need" or "Born Again"; Series 2 prequel	1 episode, 7 minutes	Euros Lyn	Russell T Davies	18 November 2005
Newly regenerated, the Tenth Doctor (David Tennant) examines his new appearance and convinces Rose Tyler (Billie Piper) that he is the same man.
"Attack of the Graske"	1 episode, 14 minutes	Ashley Way	Gareth Roberts	25 December 2005
An interactive "mini-episode" debuting on the BBC Red Button service. It featured David Tennant as the Doctor.
Series 3
The Infinite Quest	13 episodes, 45 minutes	Gary Russell	Alan Barnes	2 April 2007–30 June 2007
An animated serial debuting as segments during Totally Doctor Who made during David Tennant's tenure as The Doctor, plus his companion Martha Jones.
Series 4
"Time Crash"	1 episode, 8 minutes	Graeme Harper	Steven Moffat	16 November 2007
The episode, set during the last scene of the previous episode "Last of the Time Lords", depicts a humorous encounter between the Doctor's fifth and tenth incarnations, played by Peter Davison and David Tennant, respectively.
2008–2010 Specials
"Music of the Spheres"	1 episode, 7 minutes	Euros Lyn	Russell T Davies	27 July 2008 (BBC iPlayer and BBC Radio 3); 1 January 2009 (BBC One)
A special mini-episode with David Tennant from the 2008 BBC Proms.
Dreamland	6 episodes, 45 minutes	Gary Russell	Phil Ford	21–26 November 2009 (BBC Red Button and online); 5 December 2009 (BBC Two)
An animated serial debuting on the BBC Red Button service and the BBC Doctor Who website, and later broadcast as one episode on BBC Two.
"The Doctor and the Reindeer" A BBC One "Circle" ident	1 scene, 1 minute	N/A	Russell T Davies	4 December 2009
David Tennant portrays the Doctor in a set of scenes aired to promote Christmas on BBC One in 2009.
"A Ghost Story for Christmas"	1 episode, 3 minutes	N/A	N/A	24 December 2009
John Barrowman portrays Jack Harkness in this Weeping Angel mini-episode.
Series 5
"Meanwhile in the TARDIS" Series 5 mini-episodes	2 episode, 4 minutes	Richard Senior	Steven Moffat	8 November 2010
Mini-episodes exclusive to the Series 5 DVD and Blu-Ray release. They starred Matt Smith and Karen Gillan as the Doctor and Amy Pond.
Series 6
"Dermot and the Doctor"	1 scene, 4 minutes	Richard Senior	Steven Moffat	26 January 2011
The Doctor (Matt Smith) teams up with Dermot O'Leary in a mini-episode broadcast alongside the 2011 16th National Television Awards.
"Space" and "Time"	2 episodes, 6 minutes	Richard Senior	Steven Moffat	18 March 2011
Released as the Comic Relief special 2011 the episodes form a two-part story, set entirely within the TARDIS, starring Matt Smith as The Doctor, Karen Gillan as Amy Pond and Arthur Darvill as Rory Williams, and were written by the programme's head writer Steven Moffat.
"Death Is the Only Answer" Doctor Who series 6 supplemental episode	1 episode, 4 minutes	Jeremy Webb	The Children of Oakley Junior School	1 October 2011
Doctor Who Confidential mini-episode with Matt Smith as the Doctor and Nickolas Grace as Albert Einstein.
"The Naked Truth"	1 episode, 2 minutes	N/A	Steven Moffat	18 November 2011
Matt Smith plays the Doctor in a short mini-episode for the 2011 Children in Need telethon.
"Night and the Doctor"	5 episodes, 16 minutes	Richard Senior	Steven Moffat	21 November 2011
Four additional scenes written and produced for "The Complete Sixth Series" boxset. The episodes are titled "Bad Night", "Good Night", "First Night" and "Last Night" with the prequel "Up All Night" attached.
Series 7
"Good as Gold"	1 episode, 3 minutes	Saul Metzstein	The Children of Ashdene School	24 April 2012
Mini-episode with Matt Smith as the Eleventh Doctor that aired during Blue Peter.
Pond Life	5 episodes, 5 minutes	Saul Metzstein	Chris Chibnall	27–31 August 2012 (webcast); 1 September 2012 (BBC Red Button)
Five part mini-adventure premiering on the BBC's Doctor Who website. An omnibus version was shown on 1 September 2012 on the BBC Red Button service, and subsequently uploaded onto YouTube on the official BBC channel. Amy and Rory's life is seen throughout the year after the Doctor reunited with them at Christmas, leading up to the series 7 premiere, "Asylum of the Daleks". Several times, they receive the Doctor's calls, learning of many ridiculous things he's up to. Other times, he shows up at the wrong time due to the TARDIS malfunctioning. He even accidentally leaves an Ood with them for a short while. When the Doctor calls again, he finds no one is home; he deletes his call. Unknown to him, Amy has kicked Rory out and is wishing the Doctor will come.
"P.S."	1 episode, 2 minutes	N/A	Chris Chibnall	12 October 2012
An animated story with Brian Williams narrated by Arthur Darvill, exploring the aftermath of The Angels Take Manhattan from the perspective of Brian, the father of Rory Williams.
"A Hyperscape Body Swap Ticket"	1 episode	Richard Senior	Steven Moffat	26 August 2013
A special pre-filmed mini-episode with Matt Smith as the Doctor and Jenna Coleman as Clara Oswald from the 2013 BBC Proms. The titular ticket would later be seen in Clara's flat in the episode: "Dark Water".
"INFORARIUM"	1 episode, 2 minutes	N/A	Steven Moffat	24 September 2013
An additional scene written and produced for "The Complete Seventh Series" boxset, featuring the Eleventh Doctor attempting to delete himself from the database "Inforarium".
"Rain Gods"	1 episode, 2 minutes	N/A	Neil Gaiman	24 September 2013
An additional scene written and produced for "The Complete Seventh Series" boxset, featuring Doctor Who and River Song as they confront the planet of the Rain Gods. While credited to Steven Moffat, the mini-episode was actually written by Neil Gaiman.
"Clara and the TARDIS"	1 episode, 2 minutes	N/A	Steven Moffat	24 September 2013
An additional scene written and produced for "The Complete Seventh Series" boxset, featuring Clara as she confronts the time machine's supposedly negative behaviour towards her.
2013 Specials
"The Night of the Doctor"	1 episode, 7 minutes	John Hayes	Steven Moffat	14 November 2013
Paul McGann returns to the role of the Eighth Doctor. The story serves as his regeneration story into John Hurt's War Doctor,
"A Night with the Stars" The Science of Doctor Who	1 episode	Ashley Way	Steve Thompson	14 November 2013
Aired with the 2013 documentary The Science of Doctor Who was a short mini-episode featuring Matt Smith as the Doctor and Professor Brian Cox as himself.
"The Ultimate Guide"	2 scenes	Tom Cohen	Gareth Roberts	18 November 2013
Aired with the 2013 documentary The Ultimate Guide was a short mini-episode featuring Matt Smith as the Doctor and Jenna Coleman as Clara.
Series 11
"The Thirteenth Doctor"	1 scene	Jamie Childs	Chris Chibnall	16 July 2017
A scene aired during Wimbledon to announce Jodie Whittaker as the Thirteenth Doctor. The scene shows the Thirteenth Doctor using the TARDIS key to summon the TARDIS.
"Breaking the Glass Ceiling"	1 scene, 30 seconds	N/A	N/A	7 September 2018
The Thirteenth Doctor breaks the glass ceiling by existing.
"'Twas the Night Before Christmas"	1 scene, 1 minute	N/A	N/A	18 December 2018
Bradley Walsh narrates a Christmas animation with the Thirteenth Doctor and Santa.
"Comic Relief special 2019"	1 scene, 2 minutes	N/A	N/A	15 March 2019
Jodie Whittaker plays the Doctor in a short scene.
2023 Specials
"Destination: Skaro"	1 episode, 5 minutes	Jamie Donoughue	Russell T Davies	17 November 2023
Children in Need special mini-episode starring David Tennant as the Fourteenth Doctor, Julian Bleach as Davros and guest starring Mawaan Rizwan as Mr Castavillian. The first Murray Gold scored episode since "Twice Upon a Time".
"The Bedtime Story" or The Way Back Home	1 story, 5 minutes	Unknown	Unknown	24 November 2023
Special CBeebies Bedtime Story with David Tennant as the Fourteenth Doctor. First Doctor Who material aired on CBeebies.

==== Prequels ====
Short prequels serving as extra scenes to the regular episodes.

Episode title	Episodes	Directed by	Written by	Original release date
Series 2
Tardisodes	13 episodes, 10 minutes	Ashley Way	Gareth Roberts	1 April 2006 - 1 July 2006
Series 6
"The Impossible Astronaut" prequel	1 prequel, 2 minutes	N/A	Steven Moffat	25 March 2011
"The Curse of the Black Spot" prequel	1 prequel, 2 minutes	N/A	Stephen Thompson	30 April 2011
"A Good Man Goes to War" prequel	1 prequel, 2 minutes	Marcus Wilson	Steven Moffat	28 May 2011
"Let's Kill Hitler" prequel	1 prequel, 2 minutes	Steve Hughes	Steven Moffat	15 August 2011
"The Wedding of River Song" prequel	1 prequel, 1 minute	Marcus Wilson	Steven Moffat	24 September 2011
Series 7
"The Doctor, The Widow and the Wardrobe Prequel"	1 prequel, 2 minutes	Marcus Wilson	Steven Moffat	6 December 2011 (online)
"Asylum of the Daleks Prequel"	1 prequel, 2 minutes	Saul Metzstein	Steven Moffat	2 September 2012 (iTunes, Zune, and Amazon Video)
"The Making of The Gunslinger" "A Town Called Mercy" prequel	1 prequel, 2 minutes	Neill Gorton	Toby Whithouse	16 September 2012 (iTunes, Zune, and Amazon Video)
"The Great Detective" "The Snowmen" prequel	1 prequel, 4 minutes	Marcus Wilson	Steven Moffat	16 November 2012 (BBC One)
"Vastra Investigates" "The Snowmen" prequel	1 prequel, 3 minutes	John Hayes	Steven Moffat	17 December 2012 (online); 20 December 2012 (BBC Red Button)
"The Bells of Saint John – A Prequel"	1 prequel, 3 minutes	John Hayes	Steven Moffat	23 March 2013 (online); 29 March 2013 (BBC Red Button)
"The Battle of Demon's Run – Two Days Later" "The Snowmen" prequel	1 prequel, 3 minutes	Marcus Wilson	Steven Moffat	25 March 2013 (iTunes, and Amazon Video)
"She Said, He Said" "The Name of the Doctor" prequel	1 prequel, 4 minutes	Saul Metzstein	Steven Moffat	11 May 2013 (BBC Red Button)
"Clarence and the Whispermen" "The Name of the Doctor" prequel	1 prequel, 2 minutes	Stephen Woolfenden	Steven Moffat	26 May 2013 (home video release)
2013 Specials
"The Last Day" "The Day of the Doctor" prequel	1 prequel, 4 minutes	Jamie Stone	Steven Moffat	19 November 2013 (online); 2 December 2013 (home video release)
Series 8
"Deep Breath" prequel	1 prequel, 5 minutes	N/A	Steven Moffat	23 August 2014 (theatrical)
Series 9
"Prologue" "The Magician's Apprentice" prequel	1 prequel, 2 minutes	Hettie MacDonald	Steven Moffat	11 September 2015
"The Doctor's Meditation" "The Magician's Apprentice" prequel	1 prequel, 7 minutes	Ed Bazalgette	Steven Moffat	15 September 2015
Series 10
"Friend from the Future" "The Pilot" prequel	1 episode, 3 minutes	Lawrence Gough	Steven Moffat	23 April 2016
Series 13
"Welcome to the TARDIS" Flux prequel	1 scene, 30 seconds	N/A	Chris Chibnall	1 January 2021
"The Flux is Coming..." Flux prequel	1 scene, 20 seconds	N/A	N/A	9 October 2021

== Lockdown! stories ==
In 2020 and 2021 special mini-episodes were released during official online watchalongs of past stories. They were often written by well known Doctor Who writers including Russell T Davies, Steven Moffat, Chris Chibnall and Neil Gaiman. They also featured returning Doctor Who actors in them including Jodie Whittaker, Dan Starkey, Arthur Darvill, Katy Manning, Sophie Aldred, Daniel Anthony, David Bradley, Pearl Mackie and Matt Lucas. The event also featured original stories in other mediums such as prose and motion comic. They are excluded from this list.

Title	Episodes	Directed by	Written by	Original release date
"Strax Saves the Day" From "The Day of the Doctor"	1 episode, 2 minutes	Dan Starkey	Steven Moffat	21 March 2020
Dan Starkey plays Strax in a puppet-style mini-episode penned by Steven Moffat. The eight "Morbius Doctors" are seen in a cameo appearance.
"Message from the Doctor"	1 scene, 2 minutes	Jodie Whittaker	Chris Chibnall	25 March 2020
Jodie Whittaker plays the Doctor in a short scene talking about the coronavirus. Specially released by the BBC to help children who were worried about the pandemic seek comfort in the character.
"United We Stand, 2m Apart"	1 scene, 2 minutes	Jodie Whittaker	Chris Chibnall	8 April 2020
Jodie Whittaker plays the Doctor in a second short scene talking about the coronavirus.
"Rory's Story"	1 episode, 3 minutes	Arthur Darvill	Neil Gaiman	11 April 2020
Arthur Darvill returns to the role of Rory Williams for the first time in eight years.
"Farewell, Sarah Jane"	1 episode	Emily Cook	Russell T Davies	19 April 2020
A special episode celebrating the character Sarah Jane Smith and showing the events after her death. Luke, Clyde and Rani all return alongside Gita, Ace and Jo.
"Sven and the Scarf" From "Dalek"	1 episode, 3 minutes	Andrew Ireland	Andrew Ireland	30 April 2020
Mini-episode tying into the 2005 episode "Dalek".
"Pompadour" From "The Girl in the Fireplace"	1 episode, 3 minutes	N/A	Steven Moffat	6 May 2020
Mini-episode centring around the 2006 episode "The Girl in the Fireplace".
"The Zygon Isolation" From "The Zygon Invasion"	1 episode, 3 minutes	Emily Cook and Michael Williams	Peter Harness	10 May 2020
Mini-episode featuring Ingrid Oliver as Petronella Osgood.
"The Descendants of Pompeii" From "The Fires of Pompeii"	1 episode, 4 minutes	Emily Cook	James Moran	17 May 2020
Mini-episode sequel to "The Fires of Pompeii" set in the present day.
"Doctors Assemble!"	1 episode, 15 minutes	Emily Cook	James Goss	23 May 2020
All incarnations of the Doctor, voiced by impressionists, team-up in a one-off animated special. David Bradley reprises his role as the first incarnation of the Doctor.
"The Best of Days"	1 episode, 5 minutes	N/A	Steven Moffat	7 June 2020
Follows on from "The Doctor Falls" with the lives of Bill Potts, played by Pearl Mackie and Nardole, played by Matt Lucas, explored. Steven Moffat returns to write the story.
"The Genuine Article"	1 episode, 10 minutes	William Grantham	Dominic G. Martin	14 February 2021
Sequel to "Love & Monsters".

== Other ==
Title	Episodes	Directed by	Written by	Original release date
The Ultimate Adventure tie-in
"The Shrink"	1 scene, 3 minutes	N/A	N/A	6 May 1989
Jon Pertwee returns to the role of the Doctor in a short scene made to tie in with the stage play The Ultimate Adventure. It aired during On the Waterfront.
Time Lord Victorious tie-in
Daleks!	5 episodes, 45 minutes	Scott Handcock, Peter Caddock and Jon Doyle	James Goss	12 November 2020–10 December 2020
Promoted as "Doctor Who – Time Lord Victorious – Daleks!, this five-part animated serial was released weekly as a YouTube exclusive series. It starred Nicholas Briggs and Joe Sugg.

== See also ==
- List of Doctor Who serials
- List of Doctor Who missing episodes
- List of unmade Doctor Who serials
- List of Doctor Who audio releases
- List of Doctor Who radio stories
