= Doctor Who season 17 =

1979–80 season of British sci-fi TV series

Doctor Who
- Season 17
- Cover art of the Blu-ray release for the complete season
- Starring: Tom Baker; Lalla Ward; David Brierly
- No. of stories: 5 (+1 unaired)
- No. of episodes: 20 (+6 unaired)

Release
- Original network: BBC1
- Original release: 1 September 1979 – 12 January 1980

Season chronology
- ← Previous; Season 16 Next → Season 18

The seventeenth season of British science fiction television series Doctor Who began on 1 September 1979 with the story Destiny of the Daleks, and ended with The Horns of Nimon. This was Graham Williams' final season producing Doctor Who. The script editor was Douglas Adams.

== Casting ==
=== Main cast ===
- Tom Baker as the Fourth Doctor
- Lalla Ward as Romana
- David Brierly as Voice of K9

Tom Baker continued as the Fourth Doctor. Lalla Ward, who played Princess Astra in the season 16 finale The Armageddon Factor, returned to the series as the newly regenerated Romana, replacing Mary Tamm in the role. After John Leeson declined to return as K9, David Brierly replaced him in the part for the season's final four serials, including Shada.

== Serials ==
No. story	No. in season	Serial title	Episode titles	Directed by	Written by	Original release date	Prod. code	UK viewers (millions)	AI
104	1	Destiny of the Daleks	"Episode One"	Ken Grieve	Terry Nation	1 September 1979	5J	13.0	67
104	1	Destiny of the Daleks	"Episode Two"	Ken Grieve	Terry Nation	8 September 1979	5J	12.7	—
104	1	Destiny of the Daleks	"Episode Three"	Ken Grieve	Terry Nation	15 September 1979	5J	13.8	63
104	1	Destiny of the Daleks	"Episode Four"	Ken Grieve	Terry Nation	22 September 1979	5J	14.4	64
The TARDIS lands the Fourth Doctor and Romana on a strangely familiar planet. There, they meet the android Movellans, who are locked in a war with the Daleks. The planet is Skaro, and in a bunker sits an enemy long thought dead — Davros, creator of the Daleks.
105	2	City of Death	"Part One"	Michael Hayes	"David Agnew" (Douglas Adams and Graham Williams, from a story by David Fisher)	29 September 1979	5H	12.4	—
105	2	City of Death	"Part Two"	Michael Hayes	"David Agnew" (Douglas Adams and Graham Williams, from a story by David Fisher)	6 October 1979	5H	14.1	64
105	2	City of Death	"Part Three"	Michael Hayes	"David Agnew" (Douglas Adams and Graham Williams, from a story by David Fisher)	13 October 1979	5H	15.4	—
105	2	City of Death	"Part Four"	Michael Hayes	"David Agnew" (Douglas Adams and Graham Williams, from a story by David Fisher)	20 October 1979	5H	16.1	64
In 1979 Paris, the alien Scaroth intends to erase human history by saving his fellow Jagaroth 400 million years in the past.
106	3	The Creature from the Pit	"Part One"	Christopher Barry	David Fisher	27 October 1979	5G	9.3	—
106	3	The Creature from the Pit	"Part Two"	Christopher Barry	David Fisher	3 November 1979	5G	10.8	67
106	3	The Creature from the Pit	"Part Three"	Christopher Barry	David Fisher	10 November 1979	5G	10.2	—
106	3	The Creature from the Pit	"Part Four"	Christopher Barry	David Fisher	17 November 1979	5G	9.6	—
On the planet Chloris, the Doctor and Romana soon find themselves caught up in a long and secret enmity between the Lady Adrasta, who rules the planet in fear, and the mysterious creature that she keeps in a pit.
107	4	Nightmare of Eden	"Part One"	Alan Bromly	Bob Baker	24 November 1979	5K	8.7	—
107	4	Nightmare of Eden	"Part Two"	Alan Bromly	Bob Baker	1 December 1979	5K	9.6	—
107	4	Nightmare of Eden	"Part Three"	Alan Bromly	Bob Baker	8 December 1979	5K	9.6	—
107	4	Nightmare of Eden	"Part Four"	Alan Bromly	Bob Baker	15 December 1979	5K	9.4	65
The TARDIS lands at the site of a hyperspatial collision between two spacecraft – as a result of which, neither ship is dimensionally stable, risking the lives of all those aboard.
108	5	The Horns of Nimon	"Part One"	Kenny McBain	Anthony Read	22 December 1979	5L	6.0	—
108	5	The Horns of Nimon	"Part Two"	Kenny McBain	Anthony Read	29 December 1979	5L	8.8	—
108	5	The Horns of Nimon	"Part Three"	Kenny McBain	Anthony Read	5 January 1980	5L	9.8	—
108	5	The Horns of Nimon	"Part Four"	Kenny McBain	Anthony Read	12 January 1980	5L	10.4	67
After colliding with a spaceship, the Doctor, Romana and K9 learn that young natives from a peaceful planet called Aneth are being transported into a great labyrinth called the "Power Complex".
108.5	—	Shada	N/A	Pennant Roberts	Douglas Adams	19 July 2018 (Note: Shada was initially left unfinished due to a strike. The serial was eventually completed using animation, released digitally in November 2017, and later broadcast by BBC America on 19 July 2018 in a feature-length edit.)	5M	—	—
The story revolves around the lost planet Shada, on which the Time Lords built a prison for defeated would-be conquerors of the universe. Skagra, an up-and-coming would-be conqueror of the universe, needs the assistance of one of the prison's inmates, but finds that nobody knows where Shada is anymore except one aged Time Lord who has retired to Earth.

== Production ==
=== Scrapped stories ===
Season 17 was intended to follow the same format as had every season since Season 13, with five 4-part serials and a 6-parter closing the season out. However, the planned final serial of the season, Shada, was affected by an industrial dispute involving the BBC's technicians; while the location filming and the first studio recording session were completed, strike action by staff meant that the planned second studio session had to be cancelled. Although the dispute was resolved and plans were put in place to continue work on the story, it was eventually shelved, as the BBC was concerned that its Christmas productions might be affected. A BBC historian has suggested that by cancelling completely instead of finishing what little was required, the management could demonstrate that the strikes had consequences. Ironically, the viewer ratings of Season 17 were also affected by a strike, with the BBC's main rival, ITV, off air due to a dispute.

Multiple other stories were scrapped from this season. John Lloyd's The Doomsday Contract adapted material from his unpublished science-fiction story GiGax and would have seen Doctor summonsed to appear in court when a corporation tries to buy Earth to obtain a matter-transmutation device. Pennant Roberts' Erinella would have depicted two men fighting over a princess on the titular planet, with the Doctor being involved after arriving at the wrong time and being accused of poisoning. Allen Drury's The Tearing of the Veil would have seen fake spiritualists exploiting the widow of a vicar, with the TARDIS arriving during a seance. Philip Hinchcliffe's The Valley of the Lost would have seen an alien crash-landing in a South American jungle in 1870, but was scrapped due to cost concerns. Prior to submitting Shada, Adams pitched an untitled storyline featuring the Doctor retiring but still being called to solve problems before being replaced by Shada. An untitled Pat Mills and John Wagner storyline would have involved a parallel universe in which the Roman Empire never fell. Other scrapped storylines included Child Prodigy by Alistair Beaton and Sarah Dunant and The Secret of Cassius by Andrew Smith.

== Broadcast ==
Part 4 of The Horns of Nimon saw the last appearance of the diamond-shaped logo that had been used since The Time Warrior in 1973 until it was reintroduced in the 60th anniversary specials starting with "The Star Beast" in 2023.

The entire season was broadcast from 1 September 1979 to 12 January 1980.

== Home media ==
=== VHS releases ===
Season	Story no.	Serial name	Duration	Release date		
Season	Story no.	Serial name	Duration	UK	Australia	USA / Canada
17	104	Destiny of the Daleks	4 × 25 min	July 1994	August 1994	May 1997
17	105	City of Death	4 × 25 min	April 1991	September 1991	May 1994
17	106	The Creature from the Pit	4 × 25 min	July 2002	October 2002	October 2003
17	107	Nightmare of Eden	4 × 25 min.	December 1998	March 1999	May 1999
17	108	The Horns of Nimon	4 × 25 min.	June 2003	September 2003	October 2003
17	108.5	Shada	—N/a	July 1992	February 1993	October 1992

=== DVD and Blu-ray releases ===
All releases are for DVD unless otherwise indicated:

- ^{(B)} indicates a Blu-ray release
- ^{(D,B)} indicates a simultaneous DVD and Blu-ray release

Season	Story no.	Serial name	Duration	Release date		
Season	Story no.	Serial name	Duration	R2	R4	R1
17	104	Destiny of the Daleks (Note: Available individually or in The Complete Davros Collection box set in Regions 2 and 4. Only available individually in Region 1.)	4 × 25 min.	26 November 2007	6 February 2008	4 March 2008
17	105	City of Death	4 × 25 min.	7 November 2005	1 December 2005	8 November 2005
17	106	The Creature from the Pit	4 × 25 min.	3 May 2010	1 July 2010	7 September 2010
17	107	Nightmare of Eden	4 × 25 min.	2 April 2012	3 May 2012	8 May 2012
17	108	The Horns of Nimon (Note: Only available as part of the Myths and Legends box set in Regions 2 and 4. Only available individually in Region 1.)	4 × 25 min.	29 March 2010	3 June 2010	6 July 2010
17	108.5	Shada (Note: Only available as part of The Legacy Box set (Regions 2 and 4). Released with the same materials in the box set as Shada in Region 1.)	1 × 25 min. 4 × 18 min. 1 × 14 min.	7 January 2013	9 January 2013	8 January 2013
17	108.5	Shada (Animated Edition)	1 × 138 min.	4 December 2017^{(D,B)}	10 January 2018^{(D,B)}	4 September 2018
17	104–108 (Note: Including Shada)	Complete Season 17 (Note: Released as Doctor Who: The Collection – Season 17 in Region B. Released as Doctor Who – Tom Baker: Complete Season Six in Region A.)	27 × 25 min. 1 × 138 min. 4 × 18 min. 1 × 14 min.	20 December 2021 ^{(B)}	16 February 2022 ^{(B)}	5 April 2022 ^{(B)}

== In print ==
Season	Story no.	Library no. (Note: Number in Target's Doctor Who Library, if applicable)	Novelisation title	Author	Hardcover release date (Note: Published by Target's parent companies (Allen Wingate, W. H. Allen, BBC Books) unless otherwise indicated)	Paperback release date (Note: Published by Target Books (or by BBC Books under the Target Collection umbrella) unless otherwise indicated)	Audiobook	
Season	Story no.	Library no.	Novelisation title	Author	Hardcover release date	Paperback release date	Release date (Note: Unabridged from BBC Audio / AudioGo unless otherwise indicated)	Narrator
17	104	21	Doctor Who and the Destiny of the Daleks	Terrance Dicks	22 November 1979		5 September 2024	Jon Culshaw (Note: Dalek voices performed by Nicholas Briggs)
17	105	—N/a	City of Death (unabridged)	James Goss	21 May 2015	11 February 2016 (Note: Published by BBC Books)	21 May 2015	Lalla Ward
17	105	—N/a	City of Death (abridged)	James Goss	—N/a	5 April 2018	—N/a	
17	106	11	Doctor Who and the Creature from the Pit	David Fisher	15 January 1981		7 April 2008	Tom Baker
17	107	45	Doctor Who and the Nightmare of Eden	Terrance Dicks	18 September 1980	21 August 1980	6 October 2022	Dan Starkey
17	108	31	Doctor Who and the Horns of Nimon	Terrance Dicks	16 October 1980		4 April 2024	Geoffrey Beevers (Note: K9 voice performed by John Leeson)
17	108.5	—N/a	Shada	Gareth Roberts	15 March 2012	31 January 2013	15 March 2012	Lalla Ward
