= The Horns of Nimon =

1979–1980 Doctor Who serial

108 – The Horns of Nimon
- Doctor Who serial

Cast
- Doctor: Tom Baker – Fourth Doctor
- Companions: Lalla Ward – Romana; David Brierley (Voice of K9)
- Others: Graham Crowden – Soldeed; Michael Osborne – Sorak; Malcolm Terris – Co-Pilot; Bob Hornery – Pilot; Simon Gipps-Kent – Seth; Janet Ellis – Teka; John Bailey – Sezom; Robin Sherringham, Bob Appleby, Trevor St. John Hacker – Nimons; Clifford Norgate – Voice of the Nimon

Production
- Directed by: Kenny McBain
- Written by: Anthony Read
- Script editor: Douglas Adams
- Produced by: Graham Williams
- Executive producer: None
- Music by: Dudley Simpson
- Production code: 5L
- Series: Season 17
- Running time: 4 episodes, 25 minutes each
- First broadcast: 22 December 1979
- Last broadcast: 12 January 1980

Chronology
← Preceded by Nightmare of Eden	Followed by → Shada (unbroadcast); The Leisure Hive (broadcast)

The Horns of Nimon is the fifth and final broadcast serial of the 17th season of the British science fiction television series Doctor Who, which was first broadcast in four weekly parts on BBC1 from 22 December 1979 to 12 January 1980. It is the last broadcast of David Brierley's voice as K9 (as John Leeson returned in the next season).

The serial is set on the planets Skonnos and Crinoth. In the serial, minotaur-like aliens called the Nimons plot to invade Skonnos by creating a tunnel in time and space linked between two artificial black holes.

== Plot ==
The declining Skonnan Empire is under control of a mysterious horned being called the Nimon. It resides inside a labyrinthine Power Complex on the planet Skonnos, and communicates only with the Skonnan leader, Soldeed, who reveres the Nimon as a god. The Nimon demands a regular tribute of young people and hymetusite crystals flown in from the nearby planet Aneth.

A transport ship bearing the sacrifices breaks down and becomes stranded close to a black hole. Outside the ship, the TARDIS materialises. The Fourth Doctor attempts to save the TARDIS from being drawn into the black hole by attaching it to the Skonnan ship with a force field. He and Romana board the ship, leaving K9 behind, and are captured at gunpoint by the co-pilot, who forces them to fix the ship. The Doctor returns to the TARDIS to get supplies, and becomes stranded when the ship's engines start. Steering the TARDIS away from the black hole, he travels to Skonnos.

On Skonnos, the Nimon is enraged by the delayed sacrifice and threatens to withhold the promised armaments that will help rebuild the Skonnan Empire. The ship arrives, bearing the sacrifices and Romana, who are forced to carry the hymetusite crystals into the Power Complex. Within the labyrinth, the shifting walls force them towards the Nimon. The TARDIS materialises on Skonnos; the Doctor enters the labyrinth and distracts the Nimon, enabling Romana, Seth and Teka to escape.

In the centre of the Power Complex, the Nimon operates a transit system, opening a tunnel through a pair of black holes. Large globes carrying two more Nimon appear. It is revealed that the Nimon are a parasitic race who travel via artificial black holes between planets, draining their resources, before moving on to conquer new worlds. They are now abandoning the distant Planet Crinoth to take over Skonnos. Romana accidentally travels through the tunnel to Crinoth, which she finds overrun with Nimons. She is assisted by an old man named Sezom, who gives her a mineral called jacenite which can be used to destroy Nimons. Sezom admits that he was the one who helped the Nimons take over, falling for their promises. He realised too late that the small tributes were only the start of destruction of the whole population.

Romana is brought back to Skonnos. Amid a struggle, Seth takes Soldeed's weapon, a ceremonial staff, fits it with the jacenite, and stuns the Nimons. Soldeed is also shot by Seth, but sets off a self-destruct system to destroy the Power Complex. Guided by K9, the Doctor and his party escape from the labyrinth. The Skonnans evacuate their city as the Nimon Power Complex explodes. Seth and Teka take a spacecraft to return to Aneth, while the Nimon-infested Crinoth disintegrates.

== Production ==
=== Outside references ===
The Horns of Nimon is an analogue of the Classical Greek myth of Theseus and the Minotaur. Several names in Read's script allude to the original myth: the name of the planet Skonnos is close to Knossos; the Anethans, like the ancient Athenians, are sent to die in a Labyrinth; its guardian is Soldeed, whose name refers to Daedalus, designer of the Labyrinth at Knossos; the eponymous bull-headed Nimon is based on the Minotaur; and the Anethan hero Seth is based on Theseus.

In the closing scenes of The Horns of Nimon, the Doctor alludes to the Ancient Greek story by reminding Seth to paint his ship white (in reference to Theseus's return to Athens), and insinuates that he was personally involved in the original events of on Knossos, when he "caused quite a hoohah … Other times, other places".

== Broadcast and reception ==
Episode	Title	Run time	Original release date	UK viewers (millions)
1	"Part One"	25:41	22 December 1979	6.0
2	"Part Two"	25:02	29 December 1979	8.8
3	"Part Three"	23:26	5 January 1980	9.8
4	"Part Four"	26:45	12 January 1980	10.4

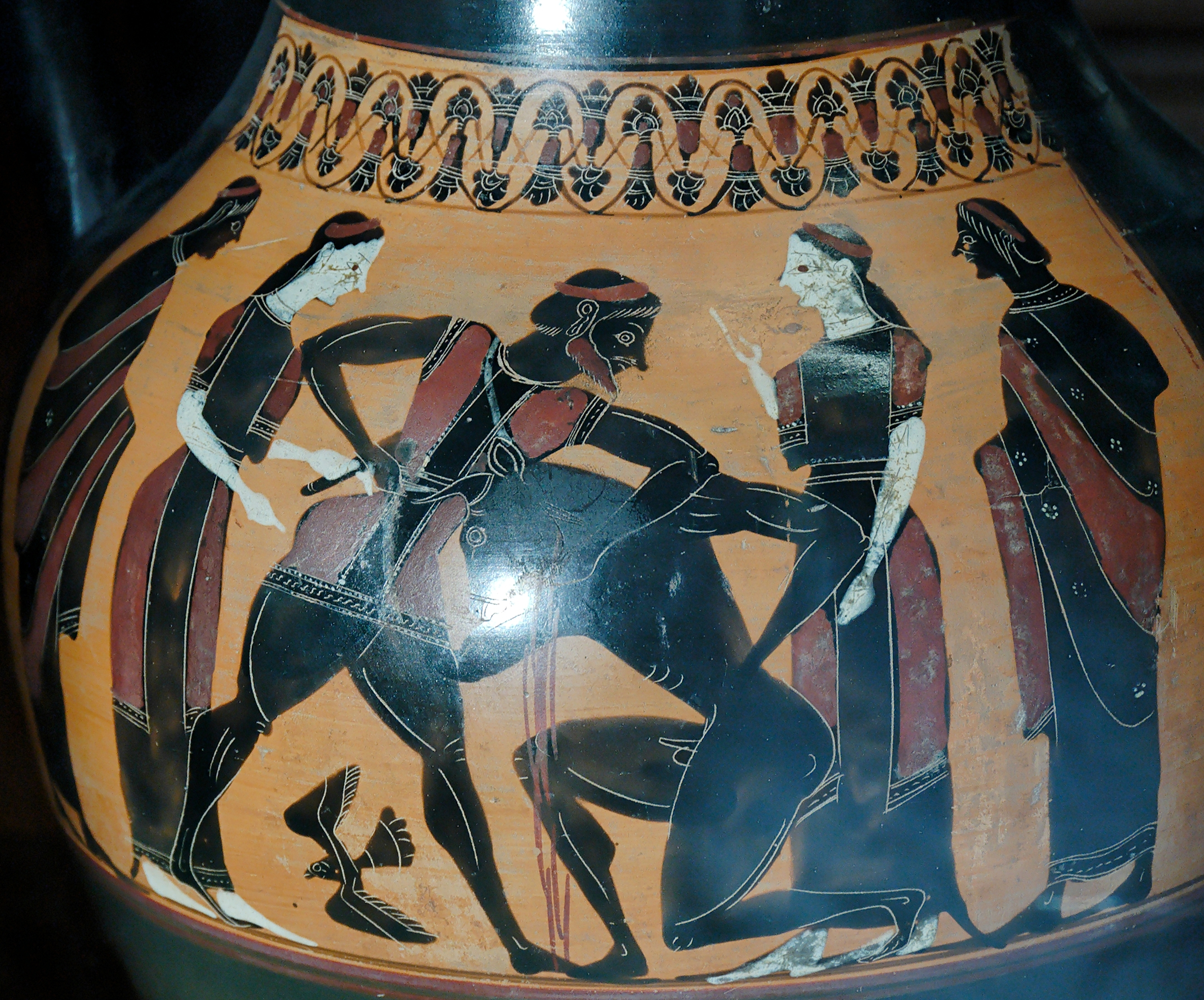
The Horns of Nimon is a modern retelling of the Ancient Greek myth of Theseus and the Minotaur

Paul Cornell, Martin Day, and Keith Topping gave a mixed review of the serial, stating "With its cheap design work, and a wonderfully watchable OTT performance from Graham Crowden, The Horns of Nimon is by turns brilliant and dull".

Doctor Who: The Television Companion's David J. Howe and Stephen James Walker noted that the serial had acquired a low reputation but they considered this to be undeserved. Although "admittedly a little more light hearted than usual" it did feature a performance by Tom Baker which was "rather more serious and intense here than in most other stories of a similar vintage". Production values were "no worse than on many other stories of this era, and rather better than on some" and the story was "ingenious and fun".

Patrick Mulkern of Radio Times was very critical of The Horns of Nimon, stating that "this tatty, embarrassing production is lowest-calibre Doctor Who". He summarised the serial as "a turgid quagmire of vapid characters, amateur dramatics, mirthless antics and clattering sets". Although the script contained "interesting concepts" these were not portrayed well due to the "absurd" Nimon costumes. Mulkern also thought the cast gave "terrible performances" with the exception of Tom Baker and Lalla Ward.

In A Critical History of Doctor Who on Television, John Kenneth Muir opined that Read's use of classical allusions to Greek mythology served little purpose, but noted that the December broadcast slot of The Horns of Nimon coincided with the British panto season, obliging the scriptwriter to include in-jokes. He considered the serial was "memorable only in its superficial, mythology-based trappings, not in its content".

Writing in 2017, Carey Fleiner linked the mythological theme of The Horns of Nimon to the idea of the monomyth popularised by the author Joseph Campbell in his 1949 book The Hero with a Thousand Faces. She noted that Campbell's writing had influenced George Lucas for his film Star Wars, released two years before The Horns of Nimon, and suggested that the popularity of Star Wars had inspired mythological content in a number of Doctor Who serials.

Den of Geek's Andrew Blair selected The Horns of Nimon as one of the ten Doctor Who stories that would make great musicals.

== Commercial releases ==
=== In print ===
Doctor Who and the Horns of Nimon
- Author: Terrance Dicks
- Cover artist: Steve Kyte
- Series: Doctor Who book: Target novelisations
- Release number: 31
- Publisher: Target Books
- Publication date: 16 October 1980
- ISBN: 0-426-20131-0

Terrance Dicks' novelisation was published by Target Books in October 1980. Dicks begins with a history of the Skonnan Empire and Soldeed, culminating in the arrival of the Nimon. Original author Anthony Read completed a new novelisation for audiobook publisher AudioGO in 2013, but with that company's suspension of operations and Read's death in 2015, the likelihood of its eventual release is now unclear. An audiobook of the Terrance Dicks version was published by BBC audio in April 2024, read by Geoffrey Beevers.

=== Home media ===
The Horns of Nimon was released on VHS in June 2003. It was released in a DVD box set entitled Myths and Legends along with The Time Monster and Underworld in March 2010. In Region 1 North America DVD, Horns of Nimon as a single title, with extras and commentary, was released on 6 July 2010. A "no extras" DVD was released as part of the Doctor Who DVD Files in Issue 139 on 30 April 2014 and as part of the season 17 Doctor Who Blu-ray Collection box set on 13 December 2021.
