= Dudley Simpson =

Australian composer and conductor

- Born: Dudley George Simpson; 4 October 1922; Malvern East, Victoria, Australia
- Died: 4 November 2017 (aged 95) Sydney, New South Wales, Australia
- Occupations: Composer, conductor, musician

Dudley George Simpson (4 October 1922 – 4 November 2017) was an Australian composer and conductor. He was the Principal Conductor of the Royal Opera House orchestra for three years and worked as a composer on British television. He worked on the BBC science-fiction series Doctor Who, for which he composed incidental music during the 1960s and 1970s. When Simpson died aged 95 in 2017, The Guardian wrote that he was "at his most prolific as the creator of incidental music for Doctor Who in the 1960s and 1970s, contributing to 62 stories over almost 300 episodes – more than any other composer."

Among his television work was the music for Moonstrike (1963), theme music for The Last of the Mohicans (1971), theme music for The Brothers (1972), The Tomorrow People (1973), Moonbase 3 (1973), The Ascent of Man (1973) and Blake's 7 (1978). He also composed music for several plays from the BBC Television Shakespeare series.

== Early life and career ==
Simpson was born in the Melbourne suburb of Malvern East. He learned piano as a child, served in New Guinea during World War II and then studied orchestration and composition at the Melbourne Conservatorium of Music at the University of Melbourne. Simpson became assistant conductor, pianist and later musical director for the Borovansky Ballet Company, forerunner to The Australian Ballet. He moved to the UK and after a season as guest conductor at Covent Garden, he became Principal Conductor of the Royal Opera House orchestra for three years. He accompanied the touring section of the Royal Ballet with Margot Fonteyn as principal ballerina.

Simpson started working for the BBC in 1961.

== Music for science fiction television ==
=== Doctor Who (1963) ===
Best known for the Daleks, Simpson's first work on Doctor Who was during William Hartnell's era as the First Doctor in Planet of Giants, in 1964, but he is primarily associated with the programme in the 1970s. He also appeared on screen as a music hall conductor in the Fourth Doctor story The Talons of Weng-Chiang (1977) at the invitation of Philip Hinchcliffe, who was the producer at the time. Simpson had to be paid a special fee for this appearance, as he was a member of the Musicians' Union and not Equity.

When John Nathan-Turner became producer of Doctor Who in 1980, he decided that the music needed to be updated, and took Simpson out for a meal telling him how much he appreciated his work on Doctor Who but that it would no longer be required as he intended to have the BBC Radiophonic Workshop provide music from that point. While Simpson was contracted to score Shada, the unfinished nature of that production meant he never started work. As a result, his last broadcast work on Doctor Who was for The Horns of Nimon.

In 1993 Simpson's music for five Doctor Who serials from the early Fourth Doctor era was released on an album called Pyramids of Mars.

In the 2017 restoration of Shada, a dedication to Simpson was shown in the end credits.

=== The Tomorrow People (1973) ===
Simpson composed the theme tune to the ITV-based Thames Television science fiction series The Tomorrow People (1973–1979). The show involves a group of teenagers with psychic, emotional and other paranormal powers to use their special gifts to battle evil spirits.

=== Blake's 7 (1978) ===
In 1978 the BBC launched a new science fiction series, Blake's 7, produced by former Doctor Who director David Maloney. It ran for 4 series and 52 episodes. Set in a fictional spaceship Liberator, the crew consisted of Roj Blake, Jenna Stannis, Kerr Avon, Vila Restal, Olag Gan, Cally, Dayna Mellanby, Del Tarrant and Soolin as well as the supercomputers Zen, Orac and Slave and the villains Travis and Servalan. Simpson provided the theme music for the series and was also responsible for the incidental music for 50 of the episodes that were broadcast from 2 January 1978 to 21 December 1981. The two exceptions are the episode entitled "Duel" (the eighth episode of series one) for which director Douglas Camfield chose to use stock music, and "Gambit" (the eleventh episode of series two), which was scored by Elizabeth Parker of the Radiophonic Workshop, the special sound creator of series two to four.

== Death ==
He died on 4 November 2017 in Sydney, Australia aged 95.

== Doctor Who credits ==
Between 1964 and 1980, Simpson composed the incidental music for the following Doctor Who serials:

- Planet of Giants
- The Crusade
- The Chase
- The Celestial Toymaker
- The Underwater Menace
- The Macra Terror
- The Evil of the Daleks
- The Ice Warriors
- Fury from the Deep
- The Seeds of Death
- The Space Pirates
- The War Games
- Spearhead from Space
- The Ambassadors of Death
- Terror of the Autons
- The Mind of Evil
- The Claws of Axos
- Colony in Space
- The Dæmons
- Day of the Daleks
- The Curse of Peladon
- The Time Monster
- The Three Doctors
- Carnival of Monsters
- Frontier in Space
- Planet of the Daleks
- The Green Death
- The Time Warrior
- Invasion of the Dinosaurs
- The Monster of Peladon
- Planet of the Spiders
- Robot
- The Ark in Space
- The Sontaran Experiment
- Genesis of the Daleks
- Planet of Evil
- Pyramids of Mars
- The Android Invasion
- The Brain of Morbius
- The Masque of Mandragora
- The Hand of Fear
- The Deadly Assassin
- The Face of Evil
- The Robots of Death
- The Talons of Weng-Chiang
- Horror of Fang Rock
- The Invisible Enemy
- Image of the Fendahl
- The Sun Makers
- Underworld
- The Invasion of Time
- The Ribos Operation
- The Pirate Planet
- The Stones of Blood
- The Androids of Tara
- The Power of Kroll
- The Armageddon Factor
- Destiny of the Daleks
- City of Death
- The Creature from the Pit
- Nightmare of Eden
- The Horns of Nimon

== Selected filmography ==
Title	Year first broadcast	Notes
Doctor Who	1963	BBC
The Tomorrow People	1973	ITV (Thames Television)
Blake's 7	1978	BBC
