= Nightmare of Eden =

107 – Nightmare of Eden
- Doctor Who serial

Cast
- Doctor: Tom Baker – Fourth Doctor
- Companions: Lalla Ward – Romana; David Brierley (Voice of K9)
- Others: Lewis Fiander – Professor Tryst; Jennifer Lonsdale – Della; Geoffrey Bateman – Dymond; David Daker – Captain Rigg; Stephen Jenn – Secker; Barry Andrews – Stott; Geoffrey Hinsliff – Officer Fisk; Peter Craze – Officer Costa; Richard Barnes, Sebastian Stride, Eden Phillips – Crewmen; Annette Peters, Lionel Sansby, Peter Roberts, Maggie Petersen – Passengers

Production
- Directed by: Alan Bromly, Graham Williams (uncredited)
- Written by: Bob Baker
- Script editor: Douglas Adams
- Produced by: Graham Williams
- Executive producer: None
- Music by: Dudley Simpson
- Production code: 5K
- Series: Season 17
- Running time: 4 episodes, 25 minutes each
- First broadcast: 24 November – 15 December 1979

Chronology
← Preceded by The Creature from the Pit	Followed by → The Horns of Nimon

Nightmare of Eden is the fourth serial of the 17th season of the British science fiction television series Doctor Who, which was first broadcast in four weekly parts on BBC1 from 24 November to 15 December 1979.

The serial is set on the interstellar cruise ship Empress. In the serial, drug smugglers try to smuggle the deadly fictional drug Vraxoin on the ship contained in alien beings called the Mandrels.

== Plot ==
The TARDIS arrives near an unstable area on the interstellar cruise ship Empress, which has emerged from hyperspace at the same co-ordinates as the trade ship Hecate, locking the two ships together. The Doctor offers to detach the two ships. Rigg, captain of the Empress, is suspicious of the Doctor, but agrees to let him try. Also aboard the Empress are a zoologist named Tryst and his assistant Della, with their CET (Continual Event Transmuter) Machine. The CET stores portions of planets on electromagnetic crystals and displays them as projections. Their most recent stop was on the planet Eden, where one of their expedition was killed, but both Tryst and Della are reluctant to provide too many details.

The crew are being menaced by clawed monsters called Mandrels who were brought to the ship from Eden. The creatures have a connection to a drug known as Vraxoin. The Doctor incinerates a Mandrel, which disintegrates into raw Vraxoin, revealing that the beasts' bodies are the source of the drug.

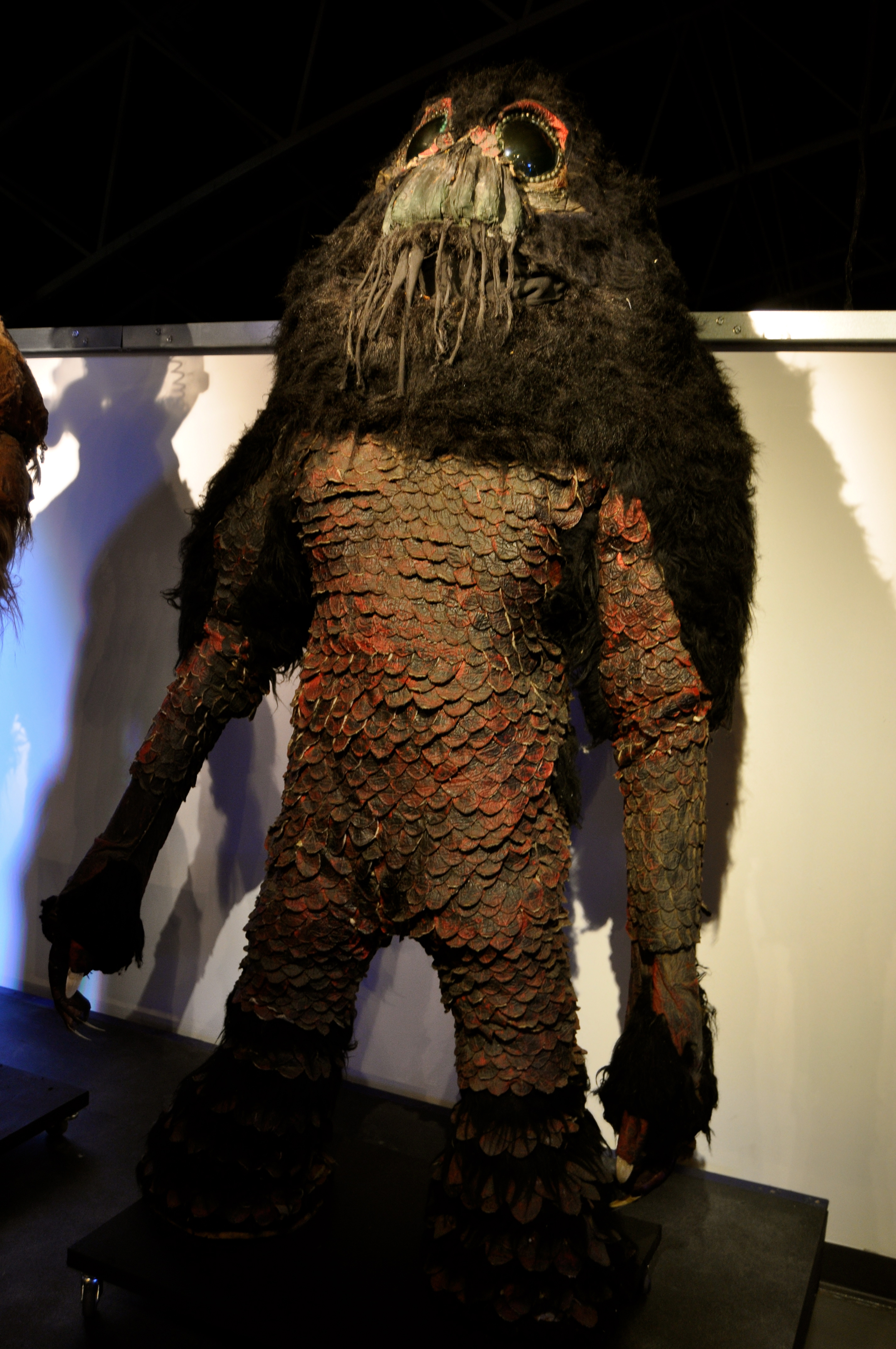
The Mandrels, on display at the Doctor Who Experience

With the help of The Doctor's companions, the ships are finally parted. In the process, the Doctor gets caught aboard the Hecate, where he finds evidence that its captain, Capt. Dymond, is complicit in the drug running project. Tryst is his accomplice aboard the Empress and they are planning to use a laser to transport the Eden projection between the two crafts.

The Doctor traps the Mandrels back in the projection. After allowing Tryst and Dymond to transport the Eden projection to the Hecate, he activates the CET and traps them within a new projection – they are ready for the Customs Officers to walk in and arrest them. With the ships separated and the drug runners caught, the Doctor and friends slip away back to the TARDIS with the Eden project.

== Production ==
It was the final Doctor Who serial written by Bob Baker, who worked on it alone, rather than with his usual writing partner Dave Martin.

Alan Bromly is credited with directing this story, but he quit partway through filming as a result of a vehement dispute with Tom Baker. As a result, producer Graham Williams wound up having to complete the director's duties uncredited. The unpleasantness of this whole incident led Williams to decide that he wished to leave the series. Bromly never directed another story for the series and retired soon afterwards.

== Broadcast and reception ==
Episode	Title	Run time	Original release date	UK viewers (millions)
1	"Part One"	24:17	24 November 1979	8.7
2	"Part Two"	22:44	1 December 1979	9.6
3	"Part Three"	24:06	8 December 1979	9.6
4	"Part Four"	24:31	15 December 1979	9.4

The British tabloid newspaper The Sun wrote that the Mandrels were terrifying monsters, as no publicity shots had been taken for them (which, as later reported, was untrue). However, the majority of critics were more scathing and many of them saw the Mandrels as being thoroughly unconvincing (particularly the Doctor Who Appreciation Society, which described them as "cute rejects from The Muppet Show"). Writer Bob Baker on the recent DVD release also expressed his disappointment with the Mandrel design.

Mark Braxton of Radio Times considered the serial to be "something of a flawed diamond". Braxton noted that the sets were "perfectly decent, for the most part" but thought the Mandrels were "the least frightening monster the show ever produced." The review concluded by stating "Overall, this sobering, sideways take on Paradise Lost deserves respect, in conception and narrative if not always in the finished product."

MM Gilroy-Sinclair of Starburst said the show was "a story with some big ideas and some shoddy production values." He was unimpressed by the Mandrels and the "plodding" story but praised the performances of Tom Baker and Lalla Ward. Despite his criticisms, Gilroy-Sinclair ended his review by stating "it actually has some wonderful moments, it is surprisingly mature; it’s clever and has some fabulous acting."

Cultbox's Malcolm Stewart described the serial as "Serious-minded but facetiously performed". However, he also stated that "For all the deficiencies in presentation, Nightmare of Eden is still a story with real science and genuine imagination at its heart."

== Commercial releases ==
=== In print ===
Doctor Who and the Nightmare of Eden
- Author: Terrance Dicks
- Cover artist: Andrew Skilleter
- Series: Doctor Who book: Target novelisations
- Release number: 45
- Publisher: Target Books
- Publication date: 21 August 1980
- ISBN: 0-426-20130-2

Terrance Dicks' novelisation was published by Target Books in August 1980.

=== Home media ===
It was released on VHS in January 1999 and on DVD on 2 April 2012. It was released as part of the Doctor Who DVD Files in Issue 134 on 19 February 2014 and as part of the season 17 Doctor Who Blu Ray Collection box set on 13 December 2021.
