= City of Death =

105 – City of Death
- Doctor Who serial

Cast
- Doctor: Tom Baker – Fourth Doctor
- Companion: Lalla Ward – Romana
- Others: Julian Glover – Scaroth/Count Scarlioni/Tancredi; Catherine Schell – Countess Scarlioni; David Graham – Kerensky; Kevin Flood – Hermann; Tom Chadbon – Duggan (Note: Also provided the 1st Jagaroth voice, uncredited.); Peter Halliday – Soldier (Note: Also provided the 2nd Jagaroth voice and the voice of the television newsreader, both uncredited.); Eleanor Bron, John Cleese – Art Gallery Visitors; Pamela Stirling – Louvre Guide

Production
- Directed by: Michael Hayes
- Written by: "David Agnew" (Douglas Adams and Graham Williams, from a story by David Fisher)
- Script editor: Douglas Adams
- Produced by: Graham Williams
- Music by: Dudley Simpson
- Production code: 5H
- Series: Season 17
- Running time: 4 episodes, 25 minutes each
- First broadcast: 29 September 1979
- Last broadcast: 20 October 1979

Chronology
← Preceded by Destiny of the Daleks	Followed by → The Creature from the Pit

City of Death is the second serial of the seventeenth season of the British science fiction television series Doctor Who. It was produced by the BBC and first broadcast in four weekly parts between 29 September 1979 and 20 October 1979 on BBC1. The serial was written by "David Agnew" – a pseudonym for the combined work of David Fisher, Douglas Adams, and Graham Williams – and directed by Michael Hayes.

City of Death features the Fourth Doctor (Tom Baker) and his companion Romana (Lalla Ward). Set primarily in present day Paris, the plot concerns a scheme by Count Scarlioni (Julian Glover), in reality an alien called Scaroth, to steal the Mona Lisa to finance experiments in time travel in the hope of averting the accident that killed the remainder of his race four hundred million years previously, which began the existence of life on the planet as well.

The original storyline devised by Fisher was heavily retooled by script editor Adams, aided by producer Williams. It was the first Doctor Who serial to film on location outside of the United Kingdom; the production team worked in Paris during April and May 1979; studio work was completed in June.

Broadcast during a strike that took ITV (the BBC's rival) off the air, City of Death scored high ratings. The fourth episode was watched by over sixteen million viewers, the highest UK television audience ever attained by an episode of Doctor Who. Although retrospectively regarded as one of the best serials from the series' classic run, initial reception was mixed, with criticism of the humorous tone. In September 2009, it was ranked as readers' eighth favourite story (of 200-to-that-date) in Doctor Who Magazine issue 413.

== Plot ==
In Paris, 1979, the Doctor and Romana sense a time distortion. They observe the Countess Scarlioni using an alien device to scan the security systems housing Leonardo da Vinci's Mona Lisa at the Louvre. The pair meet Inspector Duggan, who suspects the Countess to be involved in an art theft scheme with her husband, Count Scarlioni. Duggan joins the Doctor and Romana in investigating the Scarlioni mansion. There, they discover Dr. Kerensky's temporal experiments, the source of the distortions, and six exact copies of the Mona Lisa. The Doctor instructs Romana and Duggan to continue investigating while he returns to the TARDIS to visit Leonardo. The Count successfully steals the real painting and captures Romana and Duggan after the Doctor leaves. Learning that Romana is familiar with time, he kills Dr. Kerensky and forces Romana to continue the tests.

The Doctor arrives at Leonardo's studio but is captured by another Scarlioni, who reveals he is really Scaroth, the last Jagaroth. His people arrived on Earth 400 million years ago, but the others died when their craft exploded, and his own body was fragmented across time. Collectively, Scaroth's fragments manipulated humanity to invent technology that will let him go back in time to stop the explosion. To finance his work, he employed Leonardo to create copies of the Mona Lisa to sell off after stealing the original. After Scaroth leaves, the Doctor escapes and writes "This is a fake" on the blank canvases before returning to the present.

Scaroth threatens to destroy Paris if Romana stops helping him. The Doctor tries to gain the Countess' help by showing Scaroth's true form, but Scaroth kills her. Romana completes the work and Scaroth uses it to travel to the past. The Doctor, Romana and Duggan follow him via the TARDIS, fearing that the ship's explosion created life on Earth, and if Scaroth should prevent it, humanity would not exist. Duggan knocks Scaroth out in time, returning the latter to the present, where he is discovered, unmasked, by his bodyguard. The ensuing fight sets the mansion ablaze, destroying Scaroth and the paintings save one marked copy. Duggan argues that they've lost an invaluable piece of art, but the Doctor assures him that the copy, still done by Leonardo's hand, will go unnoticed, and that art is worthless if its monetary value is all that matters before bidding him farewell.

== Production ==
=== Conception and writing ===
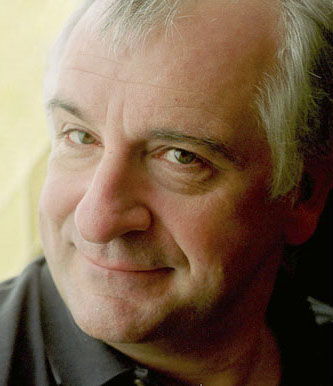
The episode was co-written by Douglas Adams.

Writer David Fisher had contributed two scripts to Doctor Who's sixteenth season – The Stones of Blood and The Androids of Tara – and was asked by producer Graham Williams for further story ideas. Fisher submitted two proposals; the first of these became The Creature from the Pit while the other, The Gamble with Time, concerned a plot to rig the casinos in Las Vegas to finance time travel experiments. Williams asked Fisher to rework The Gamble With Time as a spoof of Bulldog Drummond, a fictional adventurer from the 1920s. Fisher's draft script centered around Scarlioni, a member of the Sephiroth race, who had accidentally become fractured in time. The script was mainly set in the year 1928 with the Doctor and Romana, aided by Drummond-esque detective "Pug" Farquharson, on the trail of the stolen Mona Lisa, pursuing Scarlioni from Paris to Monte Carlo where his partner, the Baroness Heidi, is using time travel technology to cheat at roulette at the casino to fund Scarlioni's time travel experiments. Other settings included Paris in 1979, Leonardo da Vinci's studio in the year 1508, and prehistoric Earth. At this point, production unit manager John Nathan-Turner had worked out that the production team could afford to film on location in Paris with a stripped-down crew. This necessitated a rewrite to Fisher's scripts to move the action to Paris and, for cost reasons, to drop the 1920s setting. The Doctor's robotic dog companion K9 also had to be removed from the script as the cost of bringing the robot dog and his operators to Paris was prohibitive.

However, Fisher was going through a divorce, and his personal situation meant that he was unable to perform the rewrites. This meant that script editor Douglas Adams, aided by Graham Williams, had to perform a complete rewrite of the story over the course of a weekend. According to Adams, Graham Williams "took me back to his place, locked me in his study and hosed me down with whisky and black coffee for a few days, and there was the script". The revised script, now titled The Curse of the Sephiroth, was credited to "David Agnew", a standard pseudonym used by the BBC and which had been previously used on Doctor Who for the season fifteen serial The Invasion of Time. The serial was subsequently retitled City of Death on 8 May 1979. Adams would later reuse elements of City of Death, along with the unfinished Doctor Who serial Shada (1979; 2003), in his novel Dirk Gently's Holistic Detective Agency (1987).

In Part One, Lalla Ward as Romana makes a throwaway reference to a great art gallery called the Braxiatel Collection; the Virgin New Adventures novel series would later expand on this, introducing the character Irving Braxiatel, a Time Lord. Braxiatel also appears in the Bernice Summerfield series of novels and audio dramas and in the Gallifrey series of audio dramas which starred Ward as Romana.

=== Casting ===
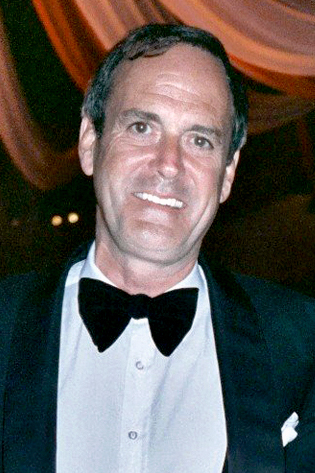
City of Death features a cameo by comedian and actor John Cleese.

Julian Glover was a well-established character actor who had previously appeared as Richard the Lionheart in The Crusade (1965). He was reluctant to don the Jagaroth mask as he felt the mask would impede his performance. As a result, he is doubled by Richard Sheekey in those scenes. Tom Chadbon was cast as Duggan on account of his resemblance to the Franco-Belgian comics hero Tintin. Peter Halliday had previously appeared in several Doctor Who serials including The Invasion and Doctor Who and the Silurians.

Douglas Adams knew John Cleese and Eleanor Bron through his connections with Monty Python and the Footlights. On learning that both would be working in BBC Television Centre on the day the art gallery scenes were to be recorded, he persuaded them to make a cameo appearance in a short scene written for "two Englishmen". Cleese and Bron agreed on the condition that there be no pre-publicity regarding their appearance; Cleese wanted them to be credited as "Helen Swanetsky" and "Kim Bread" but the BBC declined. Cleese liked the name "Kim Bread" and used it in later projects. During recording, Cleese and Baker also recorded two short comedy skits for the BBC Christmas tape.

=== Filming ===
City of Death director Michael Hayes had previously directed The Androids of Tara (1978) and The Armageddon Factor (1979). He also had experience filming in Paris, having worked there on adaptations of Maigret (1960–63) and other Georges Simenon stories for the BBC. Location filming took place in Paris between 30 April 1979 and 3 May 1979. It proved a difficult shoot as the dates coincided with the May Day holiday period, which meant that many of the locations chosen for filming were closed, necessitating considerable improvisation on the part of the cast and crew. Model filming was conducted at Bray Studios between 8 May 1979 and 10 May 1979. These concentrated on the shots of the Jagaroth spacecraft taking off from the prehistoric Earth and were overseen by Ian Scoones, a veteran of Thunderbirds. Following rehearsals, production moved to BBC Television Centre where the remaining scenes were recorded in two blocks; the first between 21 May 1979 and 22 May 1979 and second between 3 June 1979 and 5 June 1979.

Tom Baker found filming in Paris to be very different from what he was used to in the UK where crowds would gather to watch the filming and meet the stars. Doctor Who was not shown in France at the time and so the cast and crew were largely ignored. Lalla Ward found City of Death the most challenging Doctor Who serial she worked on but was pleased with the outcome, saying, "We had to film loads of scenes in the rain and cold... there was no glamour in it at all... it was different from the ordinary stories too and I like the finished result". Seeing her costumes as an important part in creating the role of Romana, Ward clashed with costume designer Doreen James, rejecting the silver catsuit James had designed for her for the story. Ward came up with the idea for the schoolgirl costume she wore in conjunction with Baker, recalling, "I thought it would be fun to wear something that little girls probably hated wearing because it might cheer them up... I didn't bank on the fact that I'd also get loads of letters from their fathers saying 'Cor! School uniform!'".

== Broadcast and reception ==
Episode	Title	Run time	Original release date	UK viewers (millions)
1	"Part One"	24:25	29 September 1979	12.4
2	"Part Two"	24:33	6 October 1979	14.1
3	"Part Three"	25:25	13 October 1979	15.4
4	"Part Four"	25:08	20 October 1979	16.1

City of Death was broadcast on BBC1 over four consecutive Saturdays beginning on 29 September 1979. At this time, industrial action had blacked out rival broadcaster ITV and as a result, the serial scored very high ratings, averaging 14.5 million viewers over the four episodes; 16.1 million watched the fourth episode, the largest audience ever recorded for an episode of Doctor Who. The story was repeated on BBC1 across four consecutive evenings from Tuesday to Friday, 12 – 15 August 1980, achieving viewing figures of 6.3, 5.5, 5.6 and 5.9 million viewers respectively.

Audience appreciation ratings for the first two parts of City of Death were a respectable score of 64%. Radio Times published two letters from viewers regarding City of Death. Les Rogers of Hastings praised the serial's cast and the location filming; less impressed, however, was Paul R. Maskew of Exeter who felt the show was being played for laughs. Responding to similar criticisms from viewers, Douglas Adams wrote, "If the programme didn't move and take a few risks then it would have died of boredom years ago". Several viewers wrote to point out the discrepancy between the current scientific estimate of the start of life on Earth of 4,000 million years ago and the date given in City of Death of 400 million years ago. Graham Williams replied, "The good Doctor makes the odd mistake or two but I think an error of 3,600 million years is pushing it! His next edition of the Encyclopedia Galactica will provide an erratum". Another viewer wrote that the atmosphere of the primordial Earth would have been poisonous to the Doctor and his companions; Douglas Adams responded to this criticism, citing artistic license.

City of Death was voted seventh in a 1998 poll of the readers of Doctor Who Magazine to find the best Doctor Who story; the magazine commented that it "represented the height of Doctor Who as popular light entertainment for all the family". In 2009, Doctor Who Magazine readers voted it in eighth place. In a more recent 2014 poll, the magazine's readers voted it fifth best Doctor Who story of all time. A 2008 article in The Daily Telegraph named City of Death one of the ten greatest episodes of Doctor Who. John Condor, writing in the fanzine DWB in 1991, hailed the story as "the best blend of kitsch, surrealism, fantasy, and comedy-drama seen in our favourite Time Lord's annals". Vanessa Bishop, reviewing the serial's DVD release, described it as "imaginatively written, well-performed and beautifully made, City of Death is a story where pretty much everything works". Reacting to the serial, as part of Doctor Who Magazine's ongoing "Time Team" feature, Jacqueline Rayner said "you're suddenly, almost violently, made aware this is happening in our world... with people just getting on with their business and two Time Lords walking through it. I don't think I've ever experienced that with Doctor Who up till now... it's the tiny touches of mundanity amid the fantastical that lift the story even higher". Charlie Jane Anders and Javier Grillo-Marxuach of io9 included it on their list of "10 TV Episodes that Changed Television", citing "the sharp dialogue and clever use of time travel [that] prefigure everything Steven Moffat has done with the series in recent years." The A.V. Club reviewer Christopher Bahn described City of Death as the "gem" of the seventeenth season, finding Adams' subtle comedy script "easily the funniest and most quotable the series ever achieved". While he praised Scarlioni's costume and the mask, he felt that more could have been done with using Paris as a filming location.

However, Doctor Who fandom's initial response was not so positive; John Peel, writing in the fanzine TARDIS in 1979, decried it as "total farce... I simply couldn't believe this was Doctor Who... the continual buffoonery is getting on my nerves". A similar view was held by Gary Russell who, reviewing the VHS release in 1991, said, "City of Death, like most Douglas Adams material, is overrated and misses the mark for me, falling between the stools of good pastiche and bad parody and making fairly unsatisfactory viewing". Vanessa Bishop countered that it was "the Doctor Who story it's alright to laugh at... we must now accept that City of Death is funny — because if we didn't the Crackerjack-style sleuths, scientists and all... would leave it knocking about near the bottom of all the Doctor Who story ranking polls" and, responding to the criticisms about the levels of comedy, that "it's precisely these things that make it seem so special". Reviewing the serial in 2011, Patrick Mulkern of Radio Times awarded it three stars out of five, stating he disliked the smug tone to the humour and Ward's "snooty" portrayal of Romana. Despite this, he noted that the serial had good production values and direction, as well as a few jokes that he enjoyed.

== Commercial releases ==
=== In print ===
Doctor Who – City of Death
- Author: James Goss
- Series: Doctor Who novelisations
- Publisher: BBC Books
- Publication date: 21 May 2015
- Pages: 320
- ISBN: 978-1-849-90675-3

Target Books approached Douglas Adams to write a novelisation, offering their standard advance of £600; Adams replied, "I don't want to be embarrassing but I do have a tendency to be a best-selling author". Target, concerned that their regular authors would seek better terms, refused to increase their offer. Several years later, Target editor Nigel Robinson offered an advance of £4,000 – double what was the standard advance at the time – but Adams again declined. Adams was unwilling to allow another author to write the novelisation. However, after Adams' death his estate allowed Gareth Roberts to write an adaptation of the unfinished serial Shada, which was published by BBC Books in 2012. In 2013, Roberts announced that he was working on a novelisation of City of Death, to be published on 21 May 2015. Roberts later announced that James Goss was working on the book instead. An abridged version was published as part of the Target Collection on 5 April 2018.

=== Home media ===
City of Death was released on VHS in April 1991 with a cover by Andrew Skilleter. It was re-issued in 2001. A DVD was released in 2005 with special features including commentary by actors Julian Glover and Tom Chadbon, as well as director Michael Hayes, and the behind-the-scenes documentary "Paris in the Springtime". It was also released as part of the Doctor Who DVD Files in Issue 37 in June 2010. On 12 January 2012, AudioGO released a two-hour soundtrack of the serial, narrated by Lalla Ward. A vinyl release of the soundtrack was released in 2018 exclusively for Record Store Day. Ian Scoones' storyboards for City of Death's special effects sequences were published in Peter Haining's book Doctor Who – 25 Glorious Years in 1988, and a Scaroth figure was released by Harlequin Miniatures in 1999. The serial was later released on the BBC iPlayer alongside most other serials from Doctor Who's original run for the programme's 60th anniversary on 1 November 2023.

== See also ==
- Eduardo de Valfierno
- Cultural references to Leonardo da Vinci

== Bibliography ==
- "David Agnew" (writer); Michael Hayes (director); Graham Williams (producer) (29 September – 20 October 1979). "City of Death". Doctor Who. Season 17. Episode 105. BBC. BBC1.
- Barnes, Alan (8 December 2004). "The Fact of Fiction. City of Death". Doctor Who Magazine (350): 16–23. ISSN 0957-9818.
- Gaiman, Neil (2003). Don't Panic. Douglas Adams and the Hitchhiker's Guide to the Galaxy (2nd ed.). London: Titan Books. ISBN 1-84023-742-2.
- Hayes, Michael, Tom Chadbon, Julian Glover (2005). City of Death DVD Commentary (City of Death DVD Special Feature). London: 2|entertain. BBCDVD1664.
- Howe, David; Stephen James Walker (2003). The Television Companion. The unofficial and unauthorised guide to Doctor Who (2nd ed.). London: Telos. ISBN 1-903889-52-9.
- Howe, David; Stephen James Walker; Mark Stammers (2005). The Handbook. The unofficial and unauthorised guide to the production of Doctor Who. London: Telos. ISBN 1-903889-96-0.
- Lofficier, Jean-Marc (1981). The Doctor Who Programme Guide – Volume 2: What's What and Who's Who. London: Target Books. ISBN 0-426-20142-6.
- Miles, Lawrence; Tat Wood (2004). About Time 4: The Unauthorized Guide to Doctor Who (Seasons 12 to 17). Illinois: Mad Norwegian Press. ISBN 0-9759446-3-0.
- Pixley, Andrew (27 October 1993). "Archive Feature. Serial 5H. City of Death". Doctor Who Magazine (205): 23–30. ISSN 0957-9818.
- Pixley, Andrew (22 December 2004). "Archive Extra. City of Death". Doctor Who Magazine Special Edition (9 – The Complete Fourth Doctor Volume Two): 37–39. ISSN 0963-1275.
- Simpson, M. J. (2003). Hitchhiker. A biography of Douglas Adams. London: Hodder and Stoughton. ISBN 0-340-82488-3.
- Stradling, Ed (producer); Morris, Jonathan (writer) (2005). Paris in the Springtime (City of Death DVD Special Feature). London: 2|entertain. BBCDVD1664.
- Wiggins, Martin (2005). Production Notes (City of Death DVD Special Feature). London: 2|entertain. BBCDVD1664.
