= Destiny of the Daleks =

104 – Destiny of the Daleks
- Doctor Who serial

Cast
- Doctor: Tom Baker – Fourth Doctor
- Companion: Lalla Ward – Romana
- Others: David Gooderson – Davros (Note: Also provided Dalek voices, uncredited.); Mike Mungarvan, Cy Town – Daleks; Roy Skelton – Dalek Voices; Peter Straker – Commander Sharrel; Suzanne Danielle – Agella; Tony Osoba – Lan; Tim Barlow – Tyssan; Penny Casdagli – Jall; David Yip – Veldan; Cassandra – Movellan Guard

Production
- Directed by: Ken Grieve
- Written by: Terry Nation
- Script editor: Douglas Adams
- Produced by: Graham Williams
- Executive producer: None
- Music by: Dudley Simpson
- Production code: 5J
- Series: Season 17
- Running time: 4 episodes, 25 minutes each
- First broadcast: 1 September – 22 September 1979

Chronology
← Preceded by The Armageddon Factor	Followed by → City of Death

Destiny of the Daleks is the first serial of the 17th season of the British science fiction television series Doctor Who, which was first broadcast in four weekly parts on BBC1 from 1 September to 22 September 1979. The story introduces Lalla Ward as the newly regenerated Romana.

It is set on the planet Skaro centuries after events of the 1975 serial Genesis of the Daleks. The Daleks arrive on Skaro to find their creator Davros (David Gooderson) in suspended animation. They seek his guidance to help them beat the Movellan race with whom the Daleks are in a stalemated war.

== Plot ==
The Fourth Doctor and a newly-regenerated Romana arrive on a rocky planet and see a group of ragged humanoids burying one of their dead, followed by the arrival of an alien spaceship which half-buries itself in a nearby valley. As the pair are about to investigate, underground explosions force them back towards the ruins, where the Doctor is trapped under a fallen concrete pillar. Romana, unaware that she’s being followed by a gaunt figure, returns to the TARDIS to reassemble K9 so he can assist, but further explosions half-bury the TARDIS in rubble. When she returns to the city she discovers the Doctor missing, and her path blocked by the gaunt man. Backing away, she falls down a rubble chute; when she regains consciousness, she is captured by three Daleks and taken for interrogation.

Meanwhile, the Doctor thanks the humanoids, Movellans, who rescued him, and learns that they are on Skaro and that they are here to wage war against the Daleks. Two Movellans bring in the gaunt stranger, an engineer from Earth called Tyssan who reveals that the Daleks used him as slave labour as part of a search operation.

Romana faked her own death to escape the Daleks and reunites with the Doctor as he, Tyssan and the Movellans make their way into the Dalek headquarters. There, the Doctor establishes that the Daleks are searching for something on a level that they have yet to access, and that he remembers an alternative route. Although the accompanying Movellans are seemingly killed en route, the Doctor, Romana and Tyssan reach the location before the Daleks, just in time to witness Davros, the Daleks’ creator, awakening from suspended animation.

With Daleks rapidly approaching, the three move Davros into a blocked-off room elsewhere in the ruins of the city. Romana and Tyssan go to get help from the Movellans but are quickly captured by the Daleks. The Doctor holds Davros hostage with a makeshift explosive and bargains with the Daleks to free all their prisoners and let him escape. Romana learns that the Movellans are not as altruistic as they appear; they intend to use their Nova Device, which makes a planet’s atmosphere flammable, to kill all life on the planet. The Doctor meets up with Tyssan and, having disabled a female Movellan scout, confirms that the Movellans are robots.

Captured by the Movellans, the Doctor and Romana learn that they and the Daleks have been in a stalemate for centuries. Realising that the Movellans will want the Doctor to give them the same advantage as he could give the Daleks, Davros orders a bomb-laden squad of his creations to attack and destroy the Movellan craft, unaware that Tyssan has taken over the vessel with the help of the freed prisoners and some reprogrammed Movellans. Romana disables Commander Sharrel before he can set off the Nova Device.

Successfully destroying Davros’s lone bodyguard, the Doctor forces Davros to destroy the Dalek suicide squad before they reach the Movellan ship. Davros is put into the custody of the former slave workers, and placed in cryogenic suspension before the journey to Earth where he will be put on trial.

=== Outside references ===
The Doctor reads Oolon Colluphid's book The Origins of the Universe and says he got it wrong "on the first line". Colluphid is a character from The Hitchhiker's Guide to the Galaxy written by script editor Douglas Adams, who inserted the reference to his own work.

== Production ==
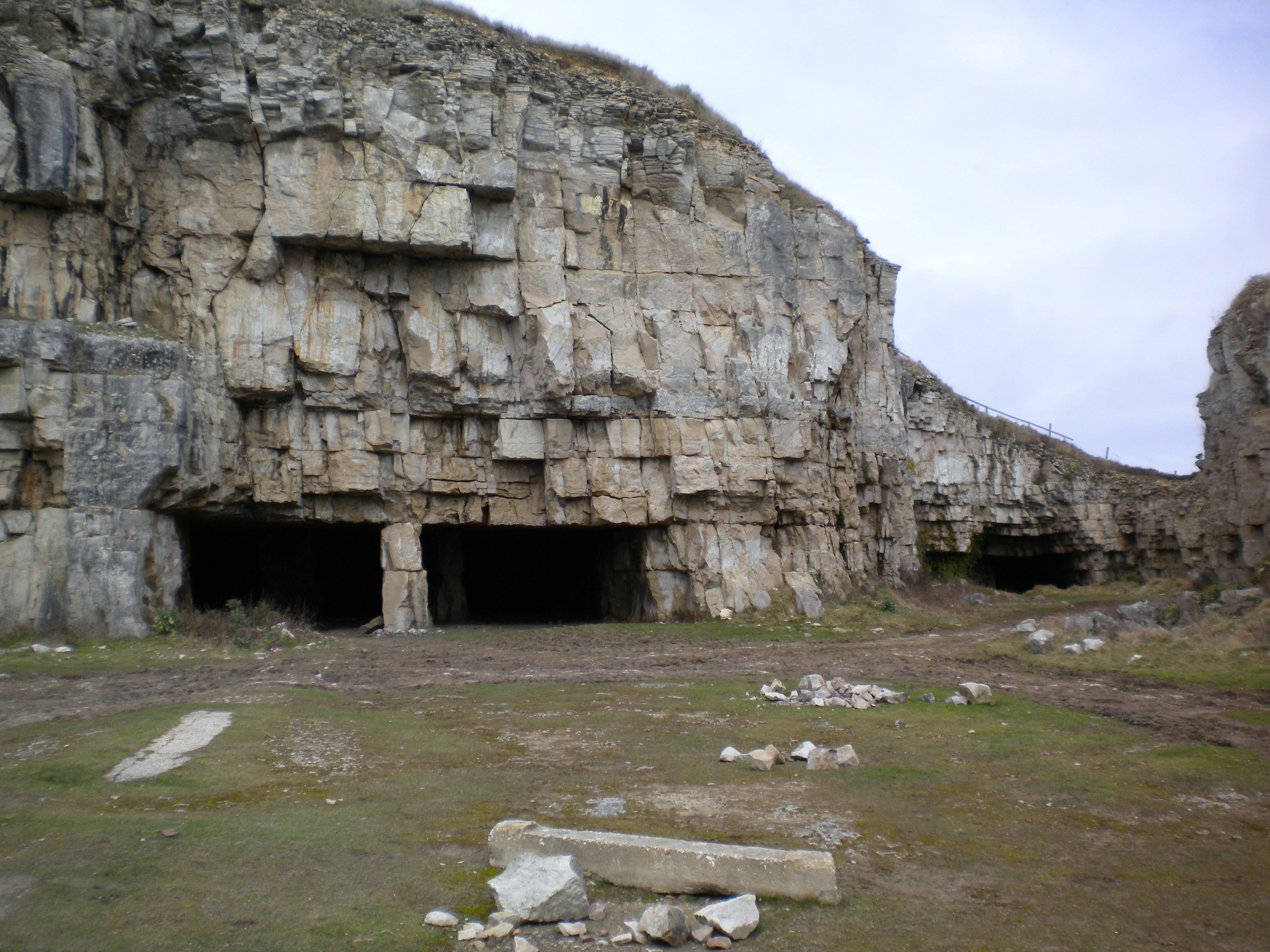
Winspit Quarry was used as a filming location for the Planet Skaro

This was Dalek creator Terry Nation's last script for Doctor Who; he declined several further offers due to the extensive uncredited story rewrite by script editor Douglas Adams, who claimed on several occasions that Nation had not delivered a script but simply several pages of story notes that rehashed previous Dalek stories. Ken Grieve, director of the serial, noted "When I arrived, I had one episode...a rough draft of the second one, and two outlines of the latter two episodes. The resolution was worked out by Douglas, [producer Graham Williams], and I." Nation moved to the United States in 1980 and went on to work for various television projects in America, most famously as a writer and producer for MacGyver.

Michael Wisher was unavailable to reprise the role of Davros, as he was on tour in Australia. David Gooderson replaced him, but the Davros mask (which was originally fitted for Wisher) was five years old and in poor condition; as a result, it suffers in appearance. K9 only appears near the start of the story, explained in-story as due to an electronic form of laryngitis – the croaking was provided by Roy Skelton. K9's later appearances in the season were voiced by David Brierley, following the departure of John Leeson. K9's absence was because the prop was unsuitable for the large amount of location filming — the production team had suffered several problems using K9 on a similar location in The Stones of Blood, and were not keen on repeating the experience. Terry Nation has said he had no desire to use K9 in his storyline; the scene (as well as other continuity gestures to Season 16) was inserted during rewrites by Douglas Adams.

Winspit Quarry in Dorset was used for the planet Skaro, also used were the quarry's small stone cottage and two larger buildings, (all of which were just empty derelict shells). The BBC added to the flooring of the two larger buildings a large number of silver coloured cylinders and pipes, sticking out of the rubble, which transformed these two derelict shells into the external ruins of the long abandoned Dalek city and the disused Kaled bunkers.

This was one of the first British productions to make use of a Steadicam; due to the high cost of such a set-up, nearly all the props and sets were reused, including the Davros mask.

The instalments are credited onscreen as "episodes", rather than "parts" – the only serial made after The Green Death to do so. In the next story, City of Death, it was returned to "parts".

=== Cast notes ===
Tim Barlow, who played Tyssan, was deaf at the time of filming.

Tony Osoba later played Kracauer in the 1987 serial Dragonfire and Duke in the 2014 episode "Kill the Moon". David Yip later played Curly in the audio play The Girl Who Never Was.

== Broadcast and reception ==
Episode	Title	Run time	Original release date	UK viewers (millions)
1	"Episode One"	24:03	1 September 1979	13.0
2	"Episode Two"	25:14	8 September 1979	12.7
3	"Episode Three"	24:32	15 September 1979	13.8
4	"Episode Four"	26:05	22 September 1979	14.4

When Episode One was broadcast, ITV was three weeks into a ten-week strike, which took it entirely off air with the exception of the Channel region, and all BBC programmes received a significant audience boost as a result. Episode Three broke the record for the highest-rated episode of Doctor Who, set by an omnibus repeat of Pyramids of Mars on 27 November 1976: this was broken again the following week. According to the BBC's Audience Research Report, the serial was received positively, especially amongst children. The Daleks and Baker were praised, though the response to Ward was more mixed. The story was repeated on BBC1 across four consecutive evenings from Tuesday to Friday, 5–8 August 1980, achieving viewing figures of 4.9, 5.8, 7.1, and 6.5 million viewers respectively.

Paul Cornell, Martin Day, and Keith Topping wrote in The Discontinuity Guide (1995) that the serial had "a tacky, inconsequential feel that comes from a decade of having its best jokes sneered at." In The Television Companion (1998), David J. Howe and Stephen James Walker criticised Romana's bizarre regeneration, the implication that the Daleks were now robots, and David Gooderson's Davros, believing the character was not only harmed by being played by a lesser actor but that he was also not as well written. Despite this, they said the story "ultimately manages to rise above all its undoubted failings and provides a fair degree of entertainment." In 2011, Mark Braxton of Radio Times wrote that the Daleks lacked menace and the script could be too comedic at times, but in spite of its flaws it was "clattering good fun". The A.V. Club reviewer Christopher Bahn praised the first episode and the introduction of the new Romana, but felt the story quickly became dull, mishandled Davros, and failed to do anything with the Daleks. Ian Berriman of SFX gave Destiny of the Daleks two out of five stars, criticising the Daleks as robots and much of the comedy. He also noted that it looked "shabby".

== Commercial releases ==
=== In print ===
Doctor Who and the Destiny of the Daleks
- Author: Terrance Dicks
- Cover artist: Andrew Skilleter
- Series: Doctor Who book: Target novelisations
- Release number: 21
- Publisher: Target Books
- Publication date: 20 November 1979
- ISBN: 0-426-20096-9

Terrance Dicks' novelisation, published by Target Books in November 1979, was released two months after transmission – one of the quickest Doctor Who novelisations, before any of the previous season's stories. A German translation was published by Goldmann in 1990.

=== Home media ===
Destiny of the Daleks was released on VHS in July 1994. In 2001 it was remastered and re-released as part of The Davros Collection, which consisted of Genesis of the Daleks, Destiny of the Daleks, Resurrection of the Daleks, Revelation of the Daleks and Remembrance of the Daleks. It was released on DVD on 26 November 2007, both on its own and as part of the Davros Collection DVD box set (as listed above). This serial was also released as part of the Doctor Who DVD Files in issue 58 on 23 March 2011. It was further remastered in 2021 and released on Blu-ray as part of Doctor Who The Collection Season 17 on 20 December 2021. The soundtrack, with linking narration by Lalla Ward, was released on vinyl by Demon Records on 13 April 2019.

== See also ==
- Dalek variants
- History of the Daleks
