= Susan Hurley =

American philosopher (1954–2007)

Susan Lynn Hurley
- Born: September 16, 1954
- Died: August 16, 2007 (aged 52)

Education
- Education: Princeton University (BA); University of Oxford (BPhil, DPhil); Harvard University (SJD)

Philosophical work
- Era: 21st-century philosophy
- Region: Western philosophy
- School: Analytic philosophy
- Main interests: Philosophy of mind Ethics; Political philosophy

Susan Lynn Hurley (September 16, 1954 – August 16, 2007) was an American philosopher. She was appointed professor in the department of Politics and International Studies at the University of Warwick in 1994, professor of philosophy at Bristol University from 2006 and the first woman fellow of All Souls College, Oxford. She wrote on practical philosophy and philosophy of mind, bringing these disciplines closer together. Her work draws on sources from the social sciences as well as the neurosciences and can be broadly characterized as both naturalistic and interdisciplinary.

== Personal life and death ==
Hurley was born in New York City and brought up in Santa Barbara, California. Her mother, a first-generation Armenian immigrant, was a secretary, and her father was an aviation industry executive. After a philosophy degree at Princeton University (1976), she studied law at Harvard, resulting in a degree in 1988, and pursued graduate work in philosophy (a BPhil, 1979, and a doctorate, 1983) at Oxford, supervised primarily by John McDowell. She married the British neuroscientist, Professor Nick Rawlins, in 1986. She died of breast cancer at 52.

== Philosophy of mind ==
In Consciousness in Action, and in many of her articles, Hurley defends vehicle externalism, the view that mental processes do not necessarily have to be explained in terms of internal processes. There is no good reason to assume, Hurley argues, that subpersonal processes on which the mind depends always need to respect the boney boundary of the skull. Hurley's externalism is connected to her critiques of what she has called 'the classical sandwich model of the mind'. Traditionally, philosophers and empirical scientists of the mind have regarded perception as input from world to mind, action as output from mind to world, and cognition as sandwiched between. According to Hurley there is no reason to suppose the mind is necessarily organised in this vertically modular way and, moreover, there is good reason to believe it is actually organised differently. An alternative would be a horizontally modular architecture, which is for example used in Rodney Brooks's robots. In one of her last texts, Hurley proposes a horizontally modular architecture that could enable social cognitive skills.

== Bibliography ==
- Hurley, Susan L. (1989). Natural Reasons. Oxford University Press. ISBN 978-0195056150.
- Hurley, Susan L. (1998). Consciousness in Action. Cambridge, Massachusetts: Harvard University Press. ISBN 978-0674164208.
- Hurley, Susan L. (2003). Justice, Luck and Knowledge. Cambridge, Massachusetts: Harvard University Press. ISBN 978-0674017702.
