= Nicholas Rawlins =

British experimental psychologist

- Born: 1949 (age 76–77)
- Occupation: Experimental psychologist
- Spouse: Susan Hurley (m. 1986; d. 2007) Lalla Ward (m. 2020)

John Nicholas Pepys Rawlins (born 31 May 1949) is a British experimental psychologist, one of the pro vice-chancellors and the vice-president of The Chinese University of Hong Kong.

== Life ==
Born in 1949, he is the only son of Sir John Rawlins and the grandson of Stuart Rawlins. He was educated at Westbury House School and Winchester College before reading for a BA in Psychology, Physiology and Philosophy at University College, Oxford. He was awarded first class honours in 1971. He subsequently studied for a D.Phil at Oxford under the supervision of Jeffrey Gray. He was married to the philosopher Susan Hurley from 1986 until her death on 16 August 2007.

Rawlins is Pro-Vice-Chancellor and Professor of Behavioural Neuroscience at the University of Oxford. His research interests include animal learning and memory, brain mechanisms of memory storage, animal models of psychosis, attentional deficits in schizophrenia, functional magnetic resonance imaging studies of pain in humans, and behavioural phenotyping of genetically modified mice.

Rawlins was a Fellow of University College, Oxford, from 1983 until the end of 2007, when he moved to a Professorial Fellowship at Wolfson College, Oxford. He retains his link with University College as an Emeritus Fellow. He was appointed as Oxford University's Pro-Vice-Chancellor for Development and External Affairs on 23 June 2010.

In 2018, Rawlins became Master of Morningside College of the Chinese University of Hong Kong. In August 2021, he was appointed as one of the Pro-Vice-Chancellors of the University. By the end of 2025, he stepped down from these two positions.

He was elected a Fellow of the Academy of Medical Sciences in 2006.

== Works ==
His most cited paper is entitled "Place Navigation Impaired in Rats with Hippocampal Lesions", published in Nature in 1982 jointly with Richard G. Morris, Paul Garrud, and John O'Keefe, which as of November 2024 had been cited 6,268 times, according to scite.ai.
