= Shada (Doctor Who) =

Unaired 1979 TV serial, later reworked

108.5 – Shada
- Doctor Who serial

Cast
- Doctor: Tom Baker – Fourth Doctor
- Companions: Lalla Ward – Romana; David Brierley – Voice of K9
- Others: Christopher Neame – Skagra; Denis Carey – Professor Chronotis; Daniel Hill – Chris Parsons; Victoria Burgoyne – Clare Keightley; Gerald Campion – Wilkin; Derek Pollitt – Dr Caldera; John Hallet – Police Constable; David Strong – Passenger; Shirley Dixon – Voice of the Ship; James Coombes – Voice of the Krargs; James Muir, Lionel Sansby, Derek Suthern, Reg Woods – Krargs

Production
- Directed by: Pennant Roberts (Note: Original 1980 version); Charles Norton (Note: 2017 version)
- Written by: Douglas Adams
- Script editor: Douglas Adams
- Produced by: Graham Williams; John Nathan-Turner (Note: 1992 version); Charles Norton
- Music by: Keff McCulloch; Mark Ayres
- Production code: 5M
- Series: Season 17
- Running time: 111 minutes; 137 minutes; 152 minutes (Note: 2021 version)
- First broadcast: 19 July 2018 (USA) (Note: The original serial would have aired weekly in the United Kingdom from 19 January to 23 February 1980.)

Chronology
← Preceded by The Horns of Nimon	Followed by → The Leisure Hive

Shada is a story from the British science fiction television series Doctor Who. Written by the series' script editor Douglas Adams, it was intended as the final serial of the 1979–80 season (season 17) but was never originally completed, owing to strike action at the BBC during studio recording.

The BBC released a completed version of Shada in 2017, with missing dialogue newly recorded by the original cast, using the same audio equipment employed in the initial shoot, and animated by the team that undertook the reconstruction of the 1966 serial The Power of the Daleks. This version was released on DVD and Blu-ray in 2017, and broadcast on American television in 2018.

A new version with enhanced animation and split into six episodes was released on 20 December 2021, as part of a Season 17 Blu-ray boxset.

Previous attempts to present the story include a narrated reconstruction for BBC Video; a re-imagined audio play by Big Finish Productions, also offered with basic Flash imagery on BBCi and the BBC's Doctor Who website; and a novelisation by Gareth Roberts, based on the latest shooting scripts, with the author's own additions.

== Synopsis ==
The Fourth Doctor answers a distress signal from Professor Chronotis, a Time Lord posing as a professor at St Cedd's College, Cambridge who lent a Gallifreyan tome to his student Chris Parsons. The Doctor retrieves the book while Chronotis dies after his mind is extracted by the sphere of a mad scientist named Skagra, living long enough to warn Romana, K9, and Parsons of them and Shada. The Doctor locates Skagra's cloaked spacecraft, only for his companions to be captured while Skagra has his sphere extract the Doctor's mind to decode the book before taking Romana in the TARDIS to his carrier ship and Krarg creations. But the Doctor survives his ordeal with his mind intact and has the ship's computer release Chris and K9 and take them to a space station Skagra previously occupied. The group finds Skagra's discarded colleagues and learn he is after a Time Lord named Salyavin.

Back on Earth, Clare Keightley accidentally revives Chronotis whose chambers are revealed as a TARDIS, the Professor explaining the book is a key to the prison planet Shada where Salyavin is held. Chronotis and Clare repair the TARDIS to reach Skagra's carrier, saving the Doctor and Chris after Skagra decodes the book and reveals his intent to absorb Salyavin's mind and use its telepathy to unite all life into a single Universal Mind.

The group reaches Shada as Skagra releases the prisoners, and Chronotis is revealed as Salyavin with Skagra extracting his mind and turning the prisoners and Chris into his thralls. Reminded that the Universal Mind contains a copy of his brain, the Doctor builds a telepathy helmet to wrest control from Skagra while the Krarg are destroyed. Skagra ends up a prisoner in his own ship while the Doctor returns the restored prisoners to Shada and parts ways with Chronotis, musing over Chronotis' exploits being exaggerated while expecting a similar treatment within two centuries.

== Production ==
Originally, writer Douglas Adams presented a wholly different idea for the season's six-part finale, involving the Doctor's retirement from adventuring. Facing resistance from producer Graham Williams, Adams chose to avoid work on a replacement, under the expectation that time pressures would eventually force the producer's hand and allow his idea to be used. Ultimately, however, Williams forced Adams to conceive a new story as a last-minute replacement, which became Shada.

Under the original remit, Williams intended the story as a discussion about the death penalty, specifically how a civilisation like the Time Lords would deal with the issue and treat its prisoners.

As composed by Adams, the story was scheduled to span six 25-minute episodes. Location filming in Cambridge and the first of three studio sessions at BBC Television Centre were completed as scheduled; however, when the scheduled second studio block was due to start, it fell foul of a long-running technicians' dispute at the BBC. The strike was over by the onset of rehearsals for the third recording session, but ultimately the studio time was redirected to other higher-priority Christmas programming, leaving the serial incomplete. It is estimated that only 50% of the story was filmed.

Following the departure of Williams from the role of producer, attempts were made by new producer John Nathan-Turner to remount the story; Nathan-Turner intended to resume filming in October 1980, for broadcast in two fifty-minute episodes over Christmas 1980. However, he was not able to secure the required studio space.

After the production halt, Adams expressed a low opinion of the script and was content to let it remain obscure, turning down offers to adapt the story in various forms. He once claimed that when he had signed the contract allowing the script's 1992 release (accompanying the serial's VHS reconstruction), it had been amongst a pile of papers sent over by his agent, and that he was unaware of what he was agreeing to.

In 1983, footage from Shada was used in "The Five Doctors", the 20th Anniversary special. Tom Baker, the fourth actor to play the Doctor, had declined to appear in the special, and the plot was reworked to explain the events in the scenes.

=== Cast notes ===
Denis Carey was subsequently cast as the eponymous Keeper in Tom Baker's penultimate story, The Keeper of Traken (1981), and also appeared as the Borad's avatar in Timelash (1985).

== Reconstruction ==
=== 1992 VHS reconstruction ===
A decade after the serial's abandonment, John Nathan-Turner set out to complete the story, in a fashion, by commissioning new effects shots and a score, and having Tom Baker record linking material to cover the missing scenes. The resulting shortened episodes (of between 14 and 22 minutes each) received a 111-minute VHS release in 1992. In its UK edition, the VHS was accompanied by a facsimile of a version of Douglas Adams's script. The release was discontinued in the UK in 1996.

This VHS reconstruction, the 2003 BBCi/Big Finish adaptation, and the 1994 documentary More Than Thirty Years in the TARDIS, were re-released together on DVD on 7 January 2013 as The Legacy Collection (UK) or simply Shada (North America).

=== 2017 animated restoration ===
On 24 November 2017, an effort to complete the serial officially, using newly recorded dialogue from the original cast (using the serial's original recording engineer and audio equipment), and new animated footage to complete the missing segments, was released as a digital download; DVD and Blu-ray releases followed on 4 December that year, in Region 2. The new sequences were animated by the same team that undertook the 2016 animated edition of the 1966 serial The Power of the Daleks, including director Charles Norton, with lead character art by Martin Geraghty, character shading by Adrian Salmon, props by Mike Collins, and background art by Daryl Joyce.

A two-disc Region 1 DVD release was originally set to be made available on 9 January 2018; this was later postponed in the US and Canada to 4 September that year. The serial was released on 10 January 2018 in Region 4.

The final completed version received its US debut broadcast on 19 July 2018, on BBC America, with guide data giving the episode title as "The Lost Episode" rather than "Shada".

=== 2021 animated restoration ===
Season 17 of Doctor Who was released on Blu-ray on 20 December 2021 as part of the Collection series, including a new version of Shada with enhanced animation. Whereas the 2017 version was only available in omnibus form, the new version was presented in the form of six separate episodes.

Episode	Title	Run time [1992 Version]	Run time [2021 Version]	Planned airdate
1	"Part One"	24:34	25:25	19 January 1980
2	"Part Two"	17:56	25:09	26 January 1980
3	"Part Three"	17:29	24:52	2 February 1980
4	"Part Four"	17:43	26:00	9 February 1980
5	"Part Five"	14:11	25:05	16 February 1980
6	"Part Six"	17:43	25:07	23 February 1980

== Other adaptations ==
Shada

Big Finish Productions audio drama
- Series: Doctor Who
- Release no.: II
- Featuring: Eighth Doctor – Paul McGann; Romana II – Lalla Ward; K9 Mk. II – John Leeson; Skagra – Andrew Sachs; Professor Chronotis – James Fox; Chris Parsons – Sean Biggerstaff; Clare Keightley – Susannah Harker; Wilkin – Melvyn Hayes; Dr Caldera – Barnaby Edwards; Motorist/Constable – Stuart Crossman; The Ship – Hannah Gordon; Think Tank Voice – Nicholas Pegg
- Written by: Douglas Adams, Gary Russell
- Directed by: Gary Russell
- Produced by: Gary Russell
- Production code: II
- Length: 150
- Release date: December 2003

=== Big Finish audio play and web animation (2003) ===
In 2003, the BBC commissioned Big Finish Productions to remake Shada as an audio play which was then webcast in six episodic segments, accompanied by limited Flash animation, on the BBC website using illustrations provided by comic strip artist Lee Sullivan. The play stars Paul McGann as the Eighth Doctor and Lalla Ward as Romana. The audio play was also broadcast on digital radio station BBC7, on 10 December 2005 (as a 2½-hour omnibus), and was repeated in six parts as the opening story to the Eighth Doctor's summer season, which began on 16 July 2006.

The webcast version (originally broadcast via BBCi's "Red Button") remains available from the BBC Doctor Who "classic series" website and an expanded audio-only version is available for purchase on CD from Big Finish. This expanded version was the one broadcast on BBC7.

==== Production ====
Tom Baker was originally approached to reprise the role of the Doctor, but declined. The Eighth Doctor was then substituted and the story reworked accordingly.

Portions of the Big Finish version were reworked by Gary Russell to make the story fit into Doctor Who continuity. This included a new introduction, and a new explanation for the Fourth Doctor and Romana being "taken out of time" during the events of "The Five Doctors": the Eighth Doctor has come to collect Romana and K9 because he has begun to have a feeling that there was something they should have done at that time.

When Skagra is investigating the Doctor, clips from three other Big Finish productions can be heard, exclusively on the CD version – The Fires of Vulcan, The Marian Conspiracy and Phantasmagoria. The original serial was to have used clips from The Pirate Planet (1978), The Power of Kroll (1978–79), The Creature from the Pit (1979), The Androids of Tara (1978), Destiny of the Daleks (1979), and City of Death (1979).

==== Outside references ====
In Episode 2 of the webcast version, when Chris is in his lab showing Clare the book, a vending machine-like object in the background is labelled "Nutrimat", a reference to a similar device in Adams' The Hitchhiker's Guide to the Galaxy. Two other references are a sequence where Skagra steals a Ford Prefect and when images of Hitchhiker's Guide characters appear as inmates on Shada itself. The character Professor Chronotis would later be re-used for Adams's novel Dirk Gently's Holistic Detective Agency, though lacking any elements related to Doctor Who.

=== Ian Levine animated version (2011) ===
In 2010, Ian Levine funded an unofficial project to complete the original Shada story using animation and the original voice actors, minus Tom Baker and David Brierley, to complete the parts of the story that were never filmed. John Leeson replaced Brierley as the voice of K9, and Paul Jones (voice actor and commercial radio producer) replaced Tom Baker as the Doctor. The completed story was finished in late 2011 and announced by Levine, via his Twitter account, on 8 September 2011. J. R. Southall, writer for the science fiction magazine Starburst, reviewed the completed version at Levine's invitation and scored it 10 out of 10 in an article published on 15 September 2011. The completed Levine version appeared on torrent sites over two years later, on 12 October 2013.

== In print ==
=== Novelisation and audio book (2012) ===
Doctor Who – Shada
- Author: Gareth Roberts
- Series: Doctor Who novelisations
- Publisher: BBC Books
- Publication date: 15 March 2012
- Pages: 416
- ISBN: 978-1-849-90327-1

Elements of the story were reused by Adams for his novel Dirk Gently's Holistic Detective Agency, in particular the character of Professor Chronotis who possesses a time machine. Adams did not allow Shada, or any of his other Doctor Who stories, to be novelised by Target Books.

A six-part adaptation of the story by Jonathan V. Way appeared in issues 13–18 of Cosmic Masque, the Doctor Who Appreciation Society's fiction magazine. Adams granted permission for the adaptation on condition that it was never published in collected form.

BBC Books published a novelisation of this serial on 15 March 2012, written by Gareth Roberts. Roberts drew on the latest versions of the scripts available, as well as adding new material of his own to "fix" what he viewed as various plotholes and unanswered questions. Nicholas Pegg, in his review of the book for Doctor Who Magazine, heartily praised it, calling it a "successful duet".

==== Audio book ====
AudioGo released an unabridged audiobook of Roberts' novelization on 15 March 2012. Narrated by Lalla Ward, with John Leeson voicing K9, it runs 11 hours and 30 minutes. It was made available for download or on 10 CDs (CD ISBN 978-1-4458-6763-2, Download ISBN 9781445867656). Vanessa Bishop reviewed it favourably for Doctor Who Magazine, singling out Simon E. Power's sound design for special praise.

== Reviews ==
Paul Cornell, Martin Day, and Keith Topping gave the serial (at the time in the form of the 1992 VHS reconstruction) a mixed review in The Discontinuity Guide (1995), saying;

'I dunno, nowadays they'll publish anything.' Infamous because it was never completed, it was for a long time stated that Shada would have been the highlight of the seventeenth season. What was filmed doesn't quite encourage such optimism. It's a very cheap looking story, and there are lashings of bad puns and dull comedy, including three takes on the 'One lump or two?/Sugar?' joke. Against that, the basic plot is interesting – almost justifying its six episodes, which is rare – and the Cambridge scenes, though stilted, are well executed. It's hugely flawed, but it's a shame that this one was clobbered by a strike and The Creature from the Pit wasn't.

Patrick Mulkern reviewed the 2017 partially reconstructed version for Radio Times, and thought that despite "pockets of magic to enjoy", it was a "sprawling but far-from-epic serial". He felt that the humour was repetitive and fell flat, and that the action was pedestrian. Mulkern recommended the novelisation by Gareth Roberts as a superior alternative.

== Bibliography ==
- Howe, David J; Stammers, Mark; Walker, Stephen James. Doctor Who: The Seventies (1994) (London: Doctor Who Books) ISBN 9781852274443
