= Myra Frances =

English actress (1942–2021)

- Born: Myra Frances Piddock; 13 April 1942; Hastings, East Sussex, England
- Died: 30 March 2021 (aged 78)
- Occupation: Actress
- Years active: 1965–1993
- Spouses: Robert Taylor (m. 1969, divorced) Peter Egan (m. 1972)
- Children: 1

Myra Frances (née Myra Frances Piddock; 13 April 1942 – 30 March 2021) was an English actress known for her role in the drama series Survivors and in Doctor Who.

== Career ==
In the 1974 Second City Firsts episode "Girl", Frances and Alison Steadman performed the first lesbian kiss on British television.

Frances is best known for her recurring role as Anne Tranter in the 1970s television drama series Survivors and for her appearance in the 1979 Doctor Who serial The Creature from the Pit, in which she played the villainous Lady Adrasta. She appeared in several comedy films of the 1970s, including Don't Just Lie There, Say Something! (1974), as Jean Fenton, having taken over from Deborah Grant in the stage production at the Garrick Theatre in 1972. She played a schoolteacher at a party in the film Remembrance (1982), about a group of Devonport-based Royal Navy ratings, due to sail to America for a six-month NATO exercise, who go out on the town on their last night in port, hitting Plymouth's notorious Union Street district, with violent results. She was James Hadleigh's love interest, Stella Clisby, in the fourth series of Hadleigh, and in 1976 played a barrister, Valerie Scott, in several episodes of Crown Court.

Frances left acting, though in the period 1991 to 1993, she directed several plays at the Mill theatre in Sonning, Berkshire.

== Personal life and death ==
Frances was first married to the actor Robert Taylor; the couple had one child, actress Rebecca Egan, but divorced. Frances met her second husband Peter Egan in 1972 while working on the show The Organisation; they married on 13 February 1972.

Along with her husband, she was an animal rights campaigner, including as an ambassador for Saving Suffering Strays and active supporter of Animals Asia Foundation.

Frances died on 30 March 2021, after suffering from cancer over a long period.
