= David Fisher (writer) =

British screenwriter (1929–2018)

- Born: 13 April 1929
- Died: 10 January 2018 (aged 88)
- Occupation: screenwriter
- Known for: Doctor Who

David Fisher (13 April 1929 – 10 January 2018) was a British television screenwriter. He is best known for writing four Doctor Who serials when it starred Tom Baker as the Fourth Doctor.

== Career ==
Doctor Who script editor Anthony Read commissioned Fisher to write The Stones of Blood (1978) and The Androids of Tara (1978) for The Key to Time storyline of season 16, and he was subsequently commissioned to write The Creature from the Pit (1979) for the seventeenth season during the tenure of Douglas Adams as script editor. He worked on a story called "A Gamble with Time", also for the seventeenth season, but owing to the divorce proceedings ending his first marriage, he was unable to finish the scripts. That story was reworked and completed by Douglas Adams and then-producer Graham Williams, and was recorded and broadcast as City of Death (1979) under the pseudonym of David Agnew. His final Doctor Who story was season eighteen's The Leisure Hive (1980).

Fisher novelised both The Leisure Hive and Creature from the Pit for the Target book range of Doctor Who novelisations, and appeared extensively on the interview features accompanying the DVD release of the former story. Fisher also wrote novelisations of The Stones of Blood and The Androids of Tara for audiobook releases in 2011 and 2012, which received print editions in 2022. He was also interviewed for a documentary accompanying the DVD release of City of Death.

Fisher's other work included writing for the television series The Troubleshooters, Dixon of Dock Green, Crown Court, and Hammer House of Horror.

== Non-fiction ==
In the late 1980s and 1990s, he often collaborated with Anthony Read on non-fiction history in print, largely related to the Second World War.

== Death ==
Fisher died on 10 January 2018, aged 88, in Norfolk, England.
