= Michael Hayes (director) =

British television director and newsreader (1929–2014)

Michael Hayes (3 April 1929 – 16 September 2014) was a British television director and newsreader. He was born in Barking in Essex.

As a young man, Hayes was an actor with the Royal Shakespeare Company. Later he worked for the BBC in various roles, beginning as a studio manager for the World Service, and working his way up to directing for television.

Perhaps his most notable work was directing the hugely successful BBC drama adaptations of various Shakespeare plays, collectively entitled An Age of Kings, in 1960. Like many TV drama professionals, after retirement he became better remembered for his work in television science fiction. Amongst Hayes's many other credits, he directed three Doctor Who serials starring Tom Baker, including 1979's City of Death, widely considered by fans to be one of the series' best stories. He also helmed the BBC's 1961 adaptation of A for Andromeda.

From 1986 to 1994 he was a newsreader for the World Service. He died in September 2014, at the age of 85.
