= The Creature from the Pit =

106 – The Creature from the Pit
- Doctor Who serial

Cast
- Doctor: Tom Baker – Fourth Doctor
- Companions: Lalla Ward – Romana; David Brierley (Voice of K9)
- Others: Myra Frances – Lady Adrasta; Eileen Way – Karela; David Telfer – Huntsman; Geoffrey Bayldon – Organon; Morris Barry – Tollund; Terry Walsh – Doran; John Bryans – Torvin; Edward Kelsey – Edu; Tim Munro – Ainu; Tommy Wright – Guardsmaster; Philip Denyer, David Redgrave – Guards

Production
- Directed by: Christopher Barry
- Written by: David Fisher
- Script editor: Douglas Adams
- Produced by: Graham Williams
- Executive producer: None
- Music by: Dudley Simpson
- Production code: 5G
- Series: Season 17
- Running time: 4 episodes, 25 minutes each
- First broadcast: 27 October – 17 November 1979

Chronology
← Preceded by City of Death	Followed by → Nightmare of Eden

The Creature from the Pit is the third serial of the 17th season of the British science fiction television series Doctor Who, which was first broadcast in four weekly parts on BBC1 from 27 October to 17 November 1979. It was the first serial to feature David Brierley as the voice of K9.

On the planet Chloris, Lady Adrasta (Myra Frances) imprisons the Tythonian ambassador Erato in a pit for fifteen years in order to maintain her control over the planet's limited metal supply. The alien time traveller the Fourth Doctor (Tom Baker) attempts to negotiate peace and a trade agreement with Erato.

== Plot ==
The use of an MK3 Emergency transceiver on the TARDIS identifies a distress signal and brings the craft to the lush jungle world of Chloris, where metal in all forms is a rare and prized commodity. The Fourth Doctor and Romana venture out to discover the remains of an enormous egg in the jungle, and when they meet the inhabitants they find a matriarchy ruled through fear by the icy and callous Lady Adrasta. Without metal to make the tools needed to keep the jungle under control, lush plant life dominates. The Lady Adrasta controls the planet's very last metal mine, holding on to power through the Huntsman and the Wolfweeds. Her throne room contains an array of metal including a shield patterned in the same way as the remnants of the shell. She mentions the Creature which dwells in a deep pit on Chloris.

Romana is captured by a party of scavengers, keen to find and hoard more metal. They are impressed by K9. The robot enables her escape and she is briefly reunited with the Doctor before he leaps into the Pit himself, determined to get to the bottom of the mystery and the Pit. Within it he encounters Organon, an astrologer thrown there by Adrasta earlier, and then comes face to face with the Creature: the vast shapeless blob rolls over him. The Doctor calculates it is not, however, dangerous, and is fascinated to note it is a herbivore which produces metal from within itself. It also forms a tentacle and draws a picture which the Doctor recognises as the shield from Adrasta's throne room. Lady Adrasta, her lady-in-waiting Karela, the Huntsman, his Wolfweeds, and some guards, enter the Pit and make their way to the Doctor, Organon, and the Creature.

The scavengers have raided the throne room for booty, including the alien shield. It exerts influence over two of them, who take it to the Pit and place it on the Creature. It turns out the shield is a communication device. Erato, as the Creature is named, is the Tythonian ambassador to Chloris and came to negotiate a treaty exchanging metal for chlorophyll fifteen years earlier. Its craft was the vast egg found in the jungle. However, Adrasta realised her power was dependent on control of the planet's metal supply and so imprisoned Erato to maintain her status. The Huntsman sets the Wolfweeds on Adrasta as Erato rolls over them both, devouring the Wolfweeds and leaving behind Adrasta's web-covered corpse. The Doctor arranges to have Erato lifted from the Pit. Adrasta's sidekick, Karela, attempts to capitalise on the situation and seize power herself—but with the help of K9 the Doctor brings it to nought.

The Doctor has rescued the Tythonian just in time – it seems Tythonus has declared war on Chloris over the missing ambassador, and has despatched a neutron star to collide with Chloris’ star and destroy the system. It is due to collide within the next twenty-four hours. Erato weaves a metal covering around the star, enabling the Doctor, using the TARDIS gravity beam, to draw the star off course and neutralise the danger. The Doctor's last act on Chloris is to push the Huntsman, now one of the de facto rulers, toward a mutually beneficial trade agreement with Erato and the Tythonians.

== Production ==
This was the first serial of the season to be filmed, shot between March and April 1979. As a result, Ward's performance and manner of dress as Romana is somewhat different from that seen in the previously broadcast serials, since she was still working out her character at the time. It was also the final story to be directed by Christopher Barry, one of Doctor Who's longest-serving contributors.

Although the Doctor's solution to the problem of the neutron star, weaving a shell of aluminium around it, has been criticised as silly, writer David Fisher claimed that the idea was in fact proposed to him by members of the Institute of Astronomy, Cambridge. Director Christopher Barry and visual effects designer Mat Irvine were reprimanded by the BBC management for the phallic appearance of the creature Erato's proboscis; during filming of the first episode it prompted uncontrolled laughter in the studio and a pair of pincers was added to the appendage.

=== Cast notes ===
David Brierley makes his debut as the voice of K9 in this story, taking over from John Leeson (who would return the following year). Adrasta's engineer, Tollund, was played by former Doctor Who director Morris Barry. Eileen Way, who played Karela, also played the Old Mother in the first Doctor Who story, An Unearthly Child (1963). Geoffrey Bayldon, who played Organon, would go on to portray an alternate version of the Doctor, one who never left Gallifrey, in the Big Finish Production Auld Mortality. Terry Walsh played Doran in Part One; this was his final appearance in the series having appeared in various roles since 1966 as well as acting as fight arranger and the stunt double for both Jon Pertwee and Tom Baker.

== Broadcast and reception ==
Episode	Title	Run time	Original release date	UK viewers (millions)
1	"Part One"	23:32	27 October 1979	9.3
2	"Part Two"	24:03	3 November 1979	10.8
3	"Part Three"	23:55	10 November 1979	10.2
4	"Part Four"	24:07	17 November 1979	9.6

Paul Cornell, Martin Day, and Keith Topping wrote in The Discontinuity Guide (1995) that the bandits were clichéd and viewers who enjoyed Douglas Adams' humour would appreciate the serial more. They observed that some have described it as "a conscious spoof of bad science fiction. On the other hand, it could just be bad science fiction." In The Television Companion (1998), David J. Howe and Stephen James Walker wrote that the setting was fleshed out but not developed enough. They also criticised the characters, acting, dialogue, and direction, though they praised Geoffrey Bayldon as Organon and Myra Frances as Adrasta. In 2011, Patrick Mulkern of Radio Times criticised the monster, but was positive towards Barry's direction and some of the "vivid characters," though he noted the bandits and minor characters were lacking. DVD Talk's John Sinnott gave The Creature from the Pit three and a half out of five stars. He described it as having "the right mixture of humor and drama," although the monster was a let-down. While Sinnott praised Baker, he criticised Ward, saying she had not yet grown into the role of Romana. Cliff Chapman of Den of Geek was also more positive, giving it four out of five stars and highlighting the acting, dialogue, and visual quality aside from the realisation of Erato.

== Commercial releases ==
Doctor Who and the Creature from the Pit
- Author: David Fisher
- Cover artist: Steve Kyte
- Series: Doctor Who book: Target novelisations
- Release number: 11
- Publisher: Target Books
- Publication date: 15 January 1981
- ISBN: 0-426-20123-X

=== In print ===
David Fisher's novelisation was published by Target Books in January 1981. It includes lengthy discourses on life on Tythonus complete with a glossary. An audiobook was released by the BBC on 7 April 2008 read by Tom Baker as part of the "Doctor Who: Classic Novels" range. The audio book was broadcast on BBC Radio 7 in April and May 2010.

=== Home media ===
The Creature from the Pit was released on VHS in July 2002 and on DVD in May 2010.
