= Thread painting =

Embroidery technique

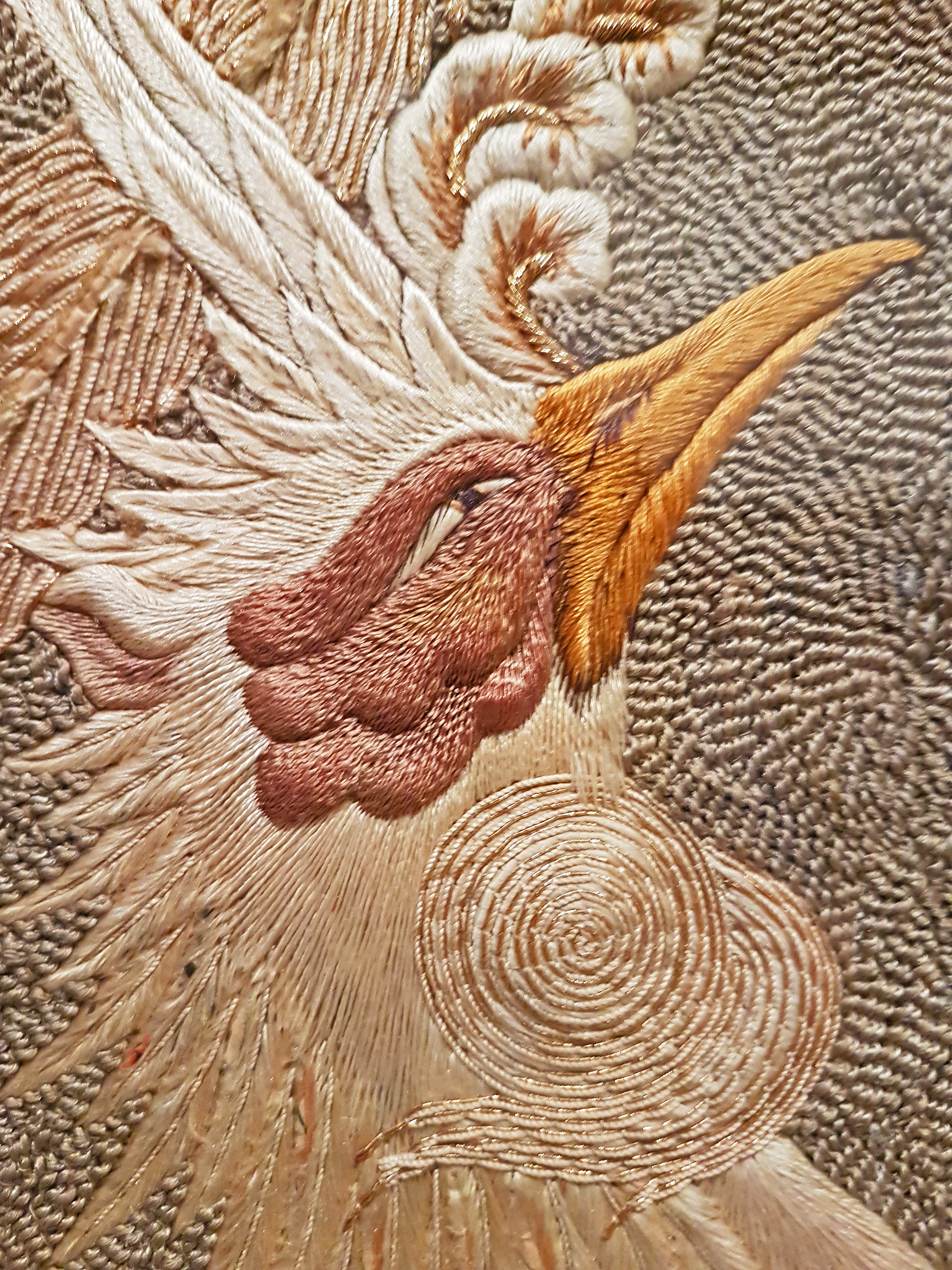
Japanese thread painting in a museum

Thread painting is an embroidery technique used to mimic the visual appearance of a painting. It is also known as silk shading and needle painting. The process is time intensive, and involves weaving different threads to create art instead of using paint. Thread painting can also evoke comparisons with photography.

== Modern art ==
One artist known for using thread painting in their work is Ptolemy Mann, who also weaves and dyes the yarn for her pieces. Another artist known for thread painting is David Poyant, who uses artificial intelligence to create the images that he then weaves. Poyant's art is displayed at the New Bedford Art Museum. A piece depicting everyday life in Latino communities in Los Angeles was created by Erik Mendel, who used denim as a canvas material. Santo Cielo spins animal fur for use as thread in his pieces. In Singapore, artist Beatrice Seck specializes in bespoke pet portraiture using thread painting techniques to achieve high realism.

== See also ==
- Beadwork
- Crossstitch
- Textile art
