= Kenny McBain =

Scottish television director

Kenny McBain (28 July 1946 – 22 April 1989) was a Scottish television director and producer.

== Early life ==
McBain was born in Glasgow and attended Hutchesons' Grammar School. He took degrees in music and English at Harvard University, and spent three years with the Prospect Theatre Company.

== Career ==
McBain worked as a director in British television on series such as Doctor Who (The Horns of Nimon (1979)) and Coronation Street, and the Omega Factor episode "Double Vision".

In the 1980s he produced Grange Hill for the BBC and Boon for Central Independent Television. He had the idea of adapting Colin Dexter's Inspector Morse novels into a television series, and produced the first two series of Inspector Morse for Central. In 1981, he directed an episode of the Granada Television series Lady Killers.

== Death ==
McBain died on 22 April 1989 from Hodgkin lymphoma.
