= David Brierly =

British actor (1935–2008)

David Brierley
- Born: David Alfred Brierly; January 1935; Chesterfield, Derbyshire, England
- Died: 10 June 2008 (aged 73); Twickenham, England
- Occupation: Actor
- Years active: 1957–2001
- Notable work: K-9 in Doctor Who (1979–1980)

David Alfred Brierly (January 1935 – 10 June 2008), also known as David Brierley, was a British actor.

Born in Chesterfield, Derbyshire, he appeared in various television programmes but is most notable for being the voice of the robot dog K-9 during the 1979–1980 season of the BBC science fiction television series Doctor Who. He succeeded John Leeson, who was K-9's original voice (Leeson subsequently returned to the role the next season). He also appeared as one of Ken Barlow's university lodgers Milo, in a very early episode of Coronation Street, later returning to play "Harold" a carpet layer who put in some carpets for Hilda Ogden, and Jimmy Kemp's father in the acclaimed nuclear war drama Threads. Brierly died of cancer on 10 June 2008.

== Filmography ==
=== Film ===
Year	Title	Role	Notes
1963	Calculated Risk	Ron	
1974	On the Game	Prince of Wales	
1974	Escort Girls	James	
1976	Adventures of a Taxi Driver	Narrator (voice)	
1984	Threads	Bill Kemp	
2000	K9 Unleashed	Himself	Direct to video
2001	Myth Makers: David Brierley	Himself	Direct to video
2017	Shada	K9	Direct to video, voice, posthumous release

=== Television ===
Year	Title	Role	Notes
1957	Noddy in Toyland	Jinky	
1958	Saturday Playhouse	Jimmy	Episode: "My Flesh, My Blood"
1958	BBC Sunday Night Theatre		Episode: "The Caine Mutiny Court-Martial"
1959, 1960, 1961	ITV Play of the Week		5 episodes
1960	The Voodoo Factor	Smith	Episode: "The Elixir"
1960	Somerset Maugham Hour		Episode: "The Alien Corn"
1960	Emergency Ward 10	Ted Carr	2 episodes
1960, 1961	Armchair Theatre		2 episodes
1961	Harpers West One	George Barton	Episode: #1.7
1961, 1972, 1983	Coronation Street	Milo/Arthur Sugden/Harold	3 episodes
1962	Z Cars	2nd Docker	Episode: "Big Catch"
1962	The Big Pull	Lieutenant Mackie	Episode: #1.6
1962	Probation Officer	Brian Walker	Episode: #4.12
1963	Moonstrike	James Miller	Episode: "A Safe House"
1964	The Valiant Varneys		Episode: "The Incredible Adventures of Sherlock Varney"
1965	The Flying Swan	Geoff Fenn	Episode: "In Quarantine"
1966	Walter and Connie Reporting	Bill	3 episodes
1973	Arthur of the Britons	Hurn	Episode: "Six Measures of Silver"
1976	Scene	TV News Crewmember	"Newsworthy: The Girl Who Saw a Tiger"
1979	Blue Peter	Voice of K9	
1979–1980	Doctor Who	Voice of K9	Serials: The Creature from the Pit; Nightmare of Eden; The Horns of Nimon, the unfinished and untransmitted Shada
1980	Nationwide	Voice of K9	
1981	Frankie Howerd Strikes Again		
1983	Juliet Bravo	Car Driver	Episode: "Guilt"
1984	Words and Pictures	Mr. Brierley	Episode: "Slippery Snow"
1985	One By One	Angry Man	Episode: "It's All Done With Mirrors"
1985	Cover Her Face	John	Episode: #1.2
1985	The Tripods	Judge	Episode: "Help From Friends"
1986	Howards' Way	Brian	Episode: #2.6
1988	Blind Justice	Conrad	Episode: "The One About The Irishman"
1992	Doctor Who: Shada	Voice of K9/Computer Voice	6 episodes. Direct to video.
1999	BBC Choice Backstage	Himself	
