= Lalla Ward =

English actress, voice artist, and author (born 1951)

The Honourable Lalla Ward
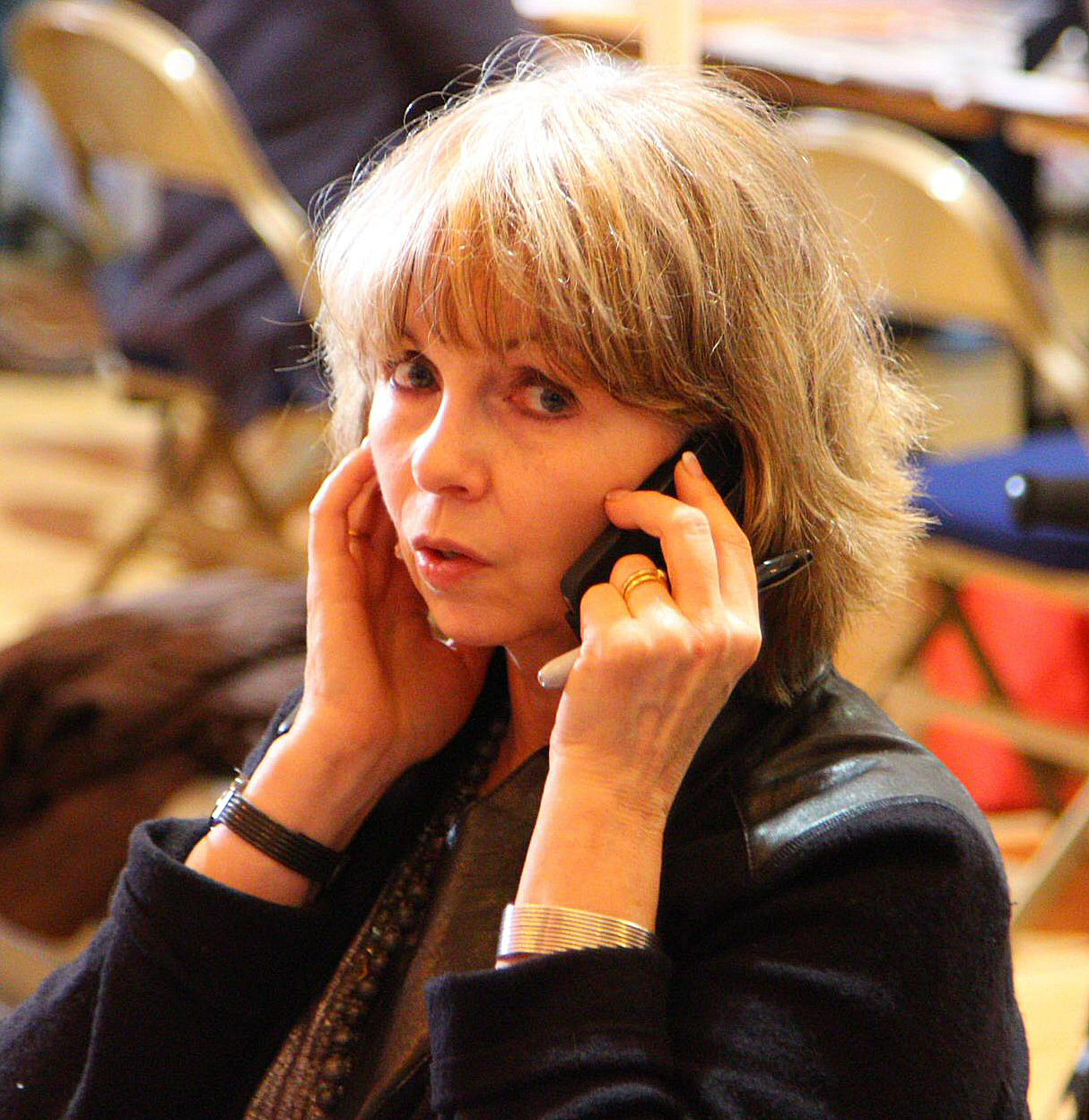
- Ward in 2014
- Born: Sarah Jill Ward; 28 June 1951 (age 75); London, England
- Education: Royal Central School of Speech and Drama
- Occupations: Actress; author; voice artist
- Years active: 1969–1993, 2013, 2017 (actress); 1985–1988 (author); 2000–present (voice artist)
- Spouses: Tom Baker (m. 1980; div. 1982) Richard Dawkins (m. 1992; div. 2016) Nicholas Rawlins (m. 2020)
- Father: Edward Ward, 7th Viscount Bangor
- Relatives: William Maxwell David Ward, 8th Viscount Bangor (half-brother), Edward Ward (brother)

Sarah Jill "Lalla" Ward (born 28 June 1951) is an English actress, voice artist and author who is best known for playing the role of Romana II in the BBC television series Doctor Who from 1979 to 1981.

== Career ==
=== Early career ===
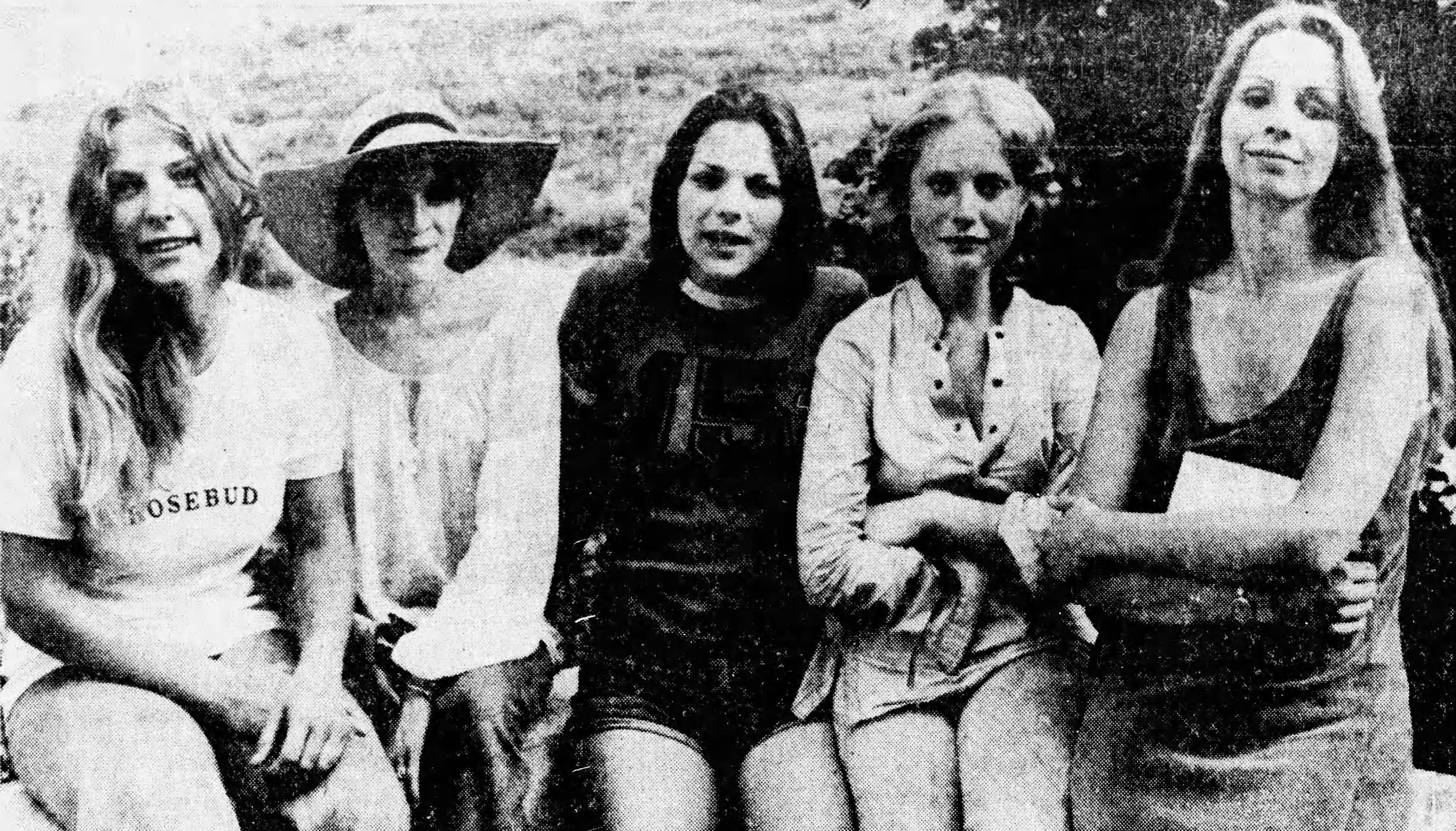
Ward (first from right) in 1974, with other actors during the filming of Rosebud. left to right: Debra Berger, Brigitte Ariel, Kim Cattrall and Isabelle Huppert.

Ward's stage name, "Lalla", originates from her attempts as a toddler to pronounce her own name. She left school at age 14 because she "loathed every single minute of it" and took her O-levels on her own. Ward studied at the Central School of Speech and Drama from 1968 to 1971. After spending a few years painting, she auditioned at London drama schools "as a sort of dare" to herself:

It was a 'see if you can do it' sort of thing, because it was the thing I hated most—just like somebody who's scared of heights might go rock climbing, or, I don't know, go potholing if they're claustrophobic.

Ward began her acting career in the Hammer horror film Vampire Circus (1972), and played Lottie, the teenage daughter of Louisa Trotter (Gemma Jones) in The Duchess of Duke Street, the BBC drama series of the mid-1970s. She appeared in the films England Made Me (1973), Matushka (1973), Rosebud (1975), and Crossed Swords (or The Prince and the Pauper) (1977). In 1974, she acted in a film called Got It Made, directed by James Kenelm Clarke. Club International magazine ran a set of nude pictures, claiming they were of her but actually featuring images from the 1978 film Sweet Virgin, and Ward successfully sued the magazine. Her television work included The Upper Crusts (1973) as the daughter of Margaret Leighton and Charles Gray, Van der Valk (1973), The Protectors (1973), Quiller (1975), Who Pays the Ferryman? (1977), as Jill Haydon, daughter of the underworld crime boss William Henry (Bill) Hayden in an episode of the British drama The Professionals, the episode entitled When the Heat Cools Off (1978) and Hazell (1979). In 1980, she played Ophelia to Derek Jacobi's Hamlet in the BBC television production.

=== Doctor Who ===
She was the second actress to play the Time Lady Romana in Doctor Who. After a guest appearance as Princess Astra in the Doctor Who story The Armageddon Factor in 1979, Ward was chosen to replace Mary Tamm, who had decided against continuing in the role. She appeared in all of Season 17's stories and then her character was written out in the fifth story of Season 18 entitled Warriors' Gate.

After Doctor Who, she appeared in the TV movie Schoolgirl Chums (1982), and The Jeweller's Shop and The Rehearsal on stage. Ward decided to end her acting career after marrying Richard Dawkins. However, she has since reprised the character of Romana in the 1993 charity special Dimensions in Time, the 2003 webcast version of Shada, and in several Doctor Who and Gallifrey audio plays produced by Big Finish Productions. She also played the 'Mistress' opposite John Leeson's 'K-9' in two audio plays from BBV. In addition, she has appeared at a number of Doctor Who conventions and related special events. In November 2013, she appeared in the one-off 50th anniversary comedy homage The Five(ish) Doctors Reboot.

=== Books ===
Ward has recorded audio books, including Steven Pinker's The Language Instinct and Shada by Gareth Roberts and Douglas Adams. She co-narrated The Selfish Gene, The Ancestor's Tale, The God Delusion, The Blind Watchmaker and The Greatest Show on Earth: The Evidence for Evolution with her then-husband. In the 1980s. She also wrote two books on knitting and one on embroidery. Ward is a keen chef, and she contributed a recipe to The Doctor Who Cookbook which was edited by Gary Downie.

She also provided illustrations for Climbing Mount Improbable and Astrology for dogs (and owners) by William Fairchild (1980).

=== Textiles and ceramics ===
Ward is a textile artist and ceramicist. Her subjects are rare and endangered animals. She refers to her technique of creating fabric pictures as thread drawing, considering this a more accurate term for her work than the commonly used thread painting.

In 2009, at the suggestion of the Gerald Durrell Foundation, she prepared an exhibition of textiles and ceramics on the theme of Galapagos wildlife. The auction raised £24,000 for the Durrell Wildlife Conservation Trust's campaign for the Floreana mockingbird and other wildlife of Galapagos.

She has shown three exhibitions at the National Theatre, London. Her 2010 textiles exhibition, Stranded, was inspired by the evolution of animals on islands. In 2011, Migration featured works which combined textiles and ceramics, the subjects seeming to move across both media. The theme of Vanishing Act, 2013, was camouflage. As with previous shows, Ward made available detailed instructions explaining her techniques. She also used one glass case to recreate her workspace, including such sources of inspiration as music, quotes, and a photo of her dog.

== Charity work ==
Ward has served for almost 20 years on the committee of the Actors' Charitable Trust (TACT) and 10 years as a trustee.

== Personal life ==
Ward was in a relationship with her co-star Tom Baker while working on Doctor Who, and they lived together in a flat in Deptford. The couple married in December 1980; however, the marriage lasted only 16 months. Ward attributed the separation to work commitments, different lifestyles and conflicts of interest. Regarding her marriage to Baker, Ward is quoted as saying:

It's something I still feel sad about. I loved – and, in many ways, still love – Tom very much. The trouble is, our careers came to be just as important as each other, and we grew apart. I was angry at suggestions that it didn't work because I was too young, or that Tom was unreasonable to me. We just irritated each other occasionally – we weren't close enough, I suppose. It was a decision we discussed and felt was for the best.

Ward said in 2004 that her long friendship with Douglas Adams, with whom she worked on Doctor Who, meant more to her and was "more valuable and more enduring" than her marriage to Baker.

In 1992, at his 40th birthday party, Adams introduced her to his friend Richard Dawkins, a biologist and author of books including The Selfish Gene and The Blind Watchmaker. Ward and Dawkins married later that year. In 2016, in a joint statement, the couple announced their amicable separation after 24 years of marriage.

In 2020, she married her third husband, Nicholas Rawlins.

=== Family ===
Sarah Ward is the daughter of Edward Ward, 7th Viscount Bangor, and his fourth wife, Marjorie Alice Banks, Lady Bangor; as such, she is entitled to use the courtesy title "The Honourable". Her father was the BBC's war correspondent in Finland at the beginning of the Second World War, while her mother was a writer and BBC producer specialising in dramatised documentaries. Her mother killed herself in July 1991.

She has a younger brother, Edward and an older half-brother, William, who is The 8th Viscount Bangor. Through her father, she is descended from The 1st Duke of Clarence, brother of Edward IV and Richard III, and from The 1st Earl of Peterborough, from The 1st Viscount Mordaunt, and from The 1st Viscount Bangor.

Her great-grandmother Mary Ward was an Anglo-Irish illustrator and amateur scientist, documented as the first person in the world to die in a motor vehicle accident.

== Filmography ==
=== Film ===
Year	Title	Role	Notes
1972	Vampire Circus	Helga	
1973	England Made Me	Young Kate	
1973	Matushka	Matushka	
1974	Got It Made	Tessa Carmichael	
1975	Rosebud	Margaret Carter	
1977	The Prince and the Pauper	Princess Elizabeth	

=== Television ===
Year	Title	Role	Notes
1969	Dr. Finlay's Casebook	Lesley	Episode: "The Visitation"
1972	Crime of Passion	Madeleine	Episode: "Janine"
1972	Shelley	Harriet Shelley	TV film
1972	Armchair Theatre	Lady Margaret	Episode: "High Summer"
1973	The Upper Crusts	Davina Seacroft	All 6 episodes
1973	The Protectors	Eva Anderson	Episode: "Bagman"
1973	Van der Valk	Judith Stolle	Episode: "The Rainbow Ends Here"
1974	Late Night Drama	Georgie	Episode: "Handle with Care: Anna"
1975	Ten from the Twenties	Kay Wargrave	Episode: "An Adventure in Bed"
1975	Quiller	Tracy Fischer	Episode: "Thundersky"
1975	Centre Play	Gemma	2 episodes
1975	The Ash Tree	Lady Augusta	TV film
1977	Leap in the Dark	Antonie	Episode: "The Fetch"
1977	Jubilee	Gilly Hamilton	Episode: "Almost Tomorrow"
1977	Who Pays the Ferryman?	Jo Hebden	Episode: "Some Talk of Alexander"
1977	The Duchess of Duke Street	Lottie	5 episodes
1978	Hazell	Sarah Courtney	Episode: "Hazell Meets the First Eleven"
1978	The Professionals	Jill Haydon	Episode: "When the Heat Cools Off"
1979	Doctor Who	Princess Astra	6 episodes; serial The Armageddon Factor
1979–1981	Doctor Who	Romana II	40 episodes
1980	Hamlet, Prince of Denmark	Ophelia	TV film
1982	Schoolgirl Chums	Anastasia Devine	TV film
1987	Riviera	Laura Grayson	TV film
1992	Doctor Who: Shada	Romana	6 episodes
1993	Dimensions in Time	Romana	Charity special
2013	The Five(ish) Doctors Reboot	Lalla Ward	TV film
2017	Doctor Who: Shada	Romana	6 episodes

== See also ==
- Asteroid 8347 Lallaward – named after her
