= Full Circle (Doctor Who) =

111 – Full Circle
- Doctor Who serial
- The Doctor and K9 observe the Marshmen emerging from the swamp in the cliffhanger to Part One. The scene was one of many shot at Black Park in Buckinghamshire.

Cast
- Doctor: Tom Baker – Fourth Doctor
- Companions: Lalla Ward – Romana; Matthew Waterhouse – Adric; John Leeson – Voice of K-9
- Others: Leonard Maguire – Draith; James Bree – Nefred; Alan Rowe – Garif; George Baker – Login; Tony Calvin – Dexeter; Richard Willis – Varsh; June Page – Keara; Bernard Padden – Tylos; Andrew Forbes – Omril; Adrian Gibbs – Rysik; Barney Lawrence – Marshman; Norman Bacon – Marshchild

Production
- Directed by: Peter Grimwade
- Written by: Andrew Smith
- Script editor: Christopher H. Bidmead
- Produced by: John Nathan-Turner
- Executive producer: Barry Letts
- Music by: Paddy Kingsland
- Production code: 5R
- Series: Season 18
- Running time: 4 episodes, 25 minutes each
- First broadcast: 25 October 1980
- Last broadcast: 15 November 1980

Chronology
← Preceded by Meglos	Followed by → State of Decay

Full Circle is the third serial of the 18th season of the British science fiction television series Doctor Who. Written by seventeen-year-old Andrew Smith and directed by Peter Grimwade, the serial was first broadcast in four weekly parts on BBC1 from 25 October to 15 November 1980. The serial sees the Fourth Doctor (Tom Baker) and his companions Romana and K9 inadvertently enter the smaller universe of E-Space, where they land on the lush forest planet Alzarius, during which an event called Mistfall causes amphibious Marshmen to rise from the water and threaten the humanoid Alzarians. The serial is the first regular appearance of the companion Adric (Matthew Waterhouse), a young orphan and mathematical prodigy among the Alzarians, as well as the first in the season's so-called "E-Space Trilogy."

The outline for Full Circle was devised by Smith, a fan of the show who had previously submitted spec scripts to it. Upon becoming the show's script editor and discovering virtually no material for the upcoming season, Christopher H. Bidmead met with Smith and commissioned a script based on his outline. Peter Grimwade, who had experience with the show as a writer and production assistant, was chosen to direct the serial. Multiple effects were designed for the story, including spider props and aquatic costumes for the Marshmen. After three days of location filming at Black Park in Buckinghamshire, the rest of the serial was filmed in studio at the BBC Television Centre, which was complicated by Tom Baker's on-set behavior. Paddy Kingsland provided the incidental music for the serial, composing leitmotifs for several characters.

The news of Tom Baker's departure from the series led to heightened media attention to the show at the time the serial aired. Despite this, Full Circle aired to relatively low ratings, never exceeding 5.9 million viewers, partially due to competing with Buck Rogers in the 25th Century on ITV, but received a decent Appreciation Index score. The serial received mostly positive reviews from contemporary fans. Retrospective reviews have also been positive, with many praising Grimwade's direction and Baker's performance, as well as the design of the Marshmen. Critics have noted the serial's approach to the theory of evolution, the role of science and ritual in the story, and its themes of authority and colonization. The serial was novelised in 1982, and received an audio sequel from Big Finish Productions titled Mistfall.

== Plot ==
After the TARDIS passes through an anomaly, the Doctor and Romana step outside onto the lush forest planet of Alzarius, home to a small civilisation of humanoids who live around a grounded spaceship from the planet Terradon, the Starliner, ruled by a triumvirate known as the Deciders. Meanwhile, a group of outcasts called the Outlers dare Adric, brother of their leader Varsh, to steal a riverfruit. Head Decider Draith and scientist Dexeter notice the presence of eggs in the riverfruit, believing it to be a sign of Mistfall, which occurs every fifty years due to the planet's orbit. As the lake water bubbles and emits mist, the Alzarians evacuate to the Starliner. Draith spots Adric stealing a riverfruit but is dragged underwater.

After Adric enters the TARDIS, the Doctor and K9 observe the amphibious Marshmen emerge from the water. The Doctor sends K9 after the Marshmen, who knock off his head. Deciders Nefred and Garif seal the Starliner and appoint citizen Login to replace Draith. The Doctor, followed by a young Marshchild, sneaks onto the Starliner. Meanwhile, Adric brings the Outlers to the TARDIS, which is carried to a cave by Marshmen. The Outlers accidentally leave Romana behind at the mercy of spiders hatching from riverfruit.

The Outlers materialize onto the Starliner. The Doctor and Adric rescue Romana, who becomes possessed after being bitten. Back on the Starliner, the Doctor is appalled when chief scientist Dexeter performs vivisection experiments on the Marshchild, who escapes and kills both Dexeter and itself. The Doctor reveals that the Starliner no longer needs repairs and is ready to depart, to which Nefred responds that nobody knows how to fly it. Meanwhile, Romana begins letting hordes of Marshmen through the Starliner's lower decks.

Nefred is fatally injured, and reveals that they do not descend from Terradonians. The Doctor cures Romana and sends Adric and Varsh to force the Marshmen off the ship with cylinders of oxygen, leading to Varsh's death. The Doctor and the cured Romana examine the cells of the spiders, Marshmen, and Alzarians, and notice their similarity. The Doctor realizes that the Alzarians are descendants of Marshmen who quickly evolved to resemble the Terradonians. The Marshmen are forced off the ship. The Doctor shows the two remaining Deciders how to pilot the ship. As the Starliner takes off, the Doctor explains to Romana that they are now trapped in the smaller universe of E-Space.

== Production ==
=== Conception ===
The first outline of Full Circle was devised by Andrew Smith, a seventeen-year-old law student and fan of the show. Smith had learned script formatting from the book The Making of Doctor Who, which featured paperwork from the production of Robot (1974–75). His only prior success was in contributing sketches to television and radio programs. He submitted his first spec script to the show in 1978, at the age of fifteen. The script, entitled The Secret of Cassius and centring on a spaceship discovering an atmosphere on Pluto, was rejected that August by Anthony Read, then the show's script editor. Read, however, encouraged Smith to continue submitting scripts. The following April, Read's successor, Douglas Adams, invited Smith to a day of studio recording for The Creature from the Pit (1979), which inspired him to outline a story under the working title The Planet That Slept, which he submitted to the show later that year.

The Planet That Slept centres around a non-aggressive, ostracised Marshchild (nicknamed "Fem" by the regulars) who becomes attached to the Doctor and Romana. At the end of the story, the female Marshchild sacrifices itself to save the Doctor. In the outline, the Marshmen are characterised as "disfigured savages and psychopaths" who worship K9 as a god and attempt to sacrifice Romana to him. The role of the Starliner also differed from the final serial. In Smith's outline, the ship is a freighter that crashes on Alzarius and is boarded by giant spiders as its crew searches for minerals.

In December 1979, Christopher H. Bidmead became Doctor Who's script editor, aiming to recentre the show around a policy of "education, education, education" and discovered that Adams had left almost no material that could be used for the show's eighteenth season, the sole available script being The Leisure Hive by David Fisher. Bidmead noticed Smith's outline for The Planet That Slept and met with him in February, not knowing prior that he was a teenager. Smith assumed that Bidmead would simply offer him guidance and was shocked when Bidmead began discussing a script, which he officially commissioned from Smith on 25 February 1980, to be due on 1 April.

=== Writing ===
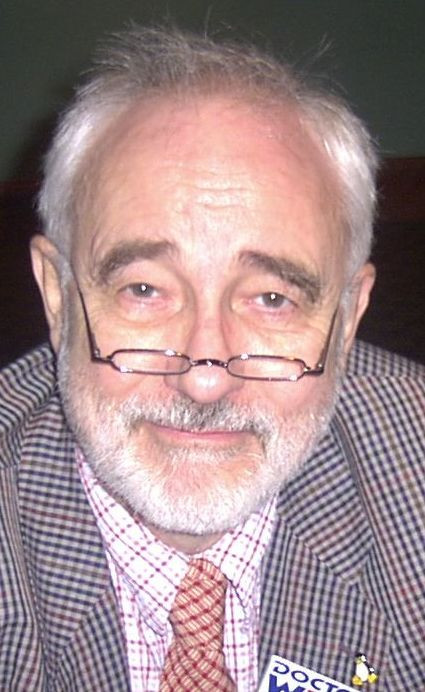
Script editor Christopher H. Bidmead suggested incorporating Full Circle into an overarching storyline set in E-Space.

Bidmead and producer John Nathan-Turner each hoped to use the serial to introduce new elements to the season. In January, Nathan-Turner, wishing to change the line-up of regulars and replace K9, devised a younger, male companion for the Doctor modeled on the literary character Artful Dodger. Bidmead named the character Adric, an anagram of the last name of Paul Dirac, the physicist who originated the theory of antimatter. Adric's original backstory as a runaway from a bureaucratic society closely paralleled that of the Doctor. In Nathan-Turner's outline for the character, Adric was from a planet called Yerfillag, the Doctor's home planet "Gallifrey" spelled backwards, and would begin traveling with the Doctor after the death of his troublemaker older brother Afrus. The idea was retained by having Alzarius' negative coordinates match those of Gallifrey's in the finished serial. With Adric to be written into the next story, eventually titled State of Decay (1980), Bidmead had Smith incorporate Adric and Afrus into The Planet that Slept, and had him given the new writer's guide for the series. The Marschild's role in the original outline was mostly replaced by that of Adric, while Afrus was renamed "Varsh." Bidmead was also interested in connecting a number of serials under a common story arc. Due to production issues on season 16, which also made use of an overarching plot, Nathan-Turner was initially hesitant. Eventually, he approved a trilogy of serials in which the Doctor and Romana would be trapped in E-Space (short for 'exo-space"), a universe with negative coordinates. A 12 June memo by Bidmead, titled The Doctor's Adventures in E-Space, provided a detailed scientific explanation of how E-Space and the Charged Vacuum Emboitement would function, as well as their effects on the Doctor's travels.

Smith submitted his script for the serial's first episode on 22 March. Happy with the script, Bidmead commissioned the script for the next three episodes three days later, which Smith turned in on his deadline of 25 April. The first draft of the serial differed in many ways from Smith's original outline. Besides adding the elements of Adric and E-Space, Bidmead and Smith developed the serial's focus on evolution, devising the origin of the Alzarians as Marshmen who had evolved to resemble the long-dead Terradonians. The first draft also added the elements of the Deciders and the hierarchy of Alzarian society. Smith imagined Adric as a runaway whose family had been killed in an accident engineered by Decider Draith, solidifying his anti-authority attitude. He also devised the character's badge for mathematical excellence. The production team removed the giant spiders from the script, prompted by the failure of an effect on an episode of Blake's 7. Smith replaced them with smaller crab spiders.

Smith's scripts went through four drafts in all. Although initially surprised at Bidmead's changes, Smith characterised the development process as collaborative. He described Bidmead's contribution as growing throughout the serial, with Part One being mostly his own. Nathan-Turner asked Smith to revise his first draft of the final episode, which he felt did not sufficiently involve the Doctor as an active character. The treatment of the Marshchild was also changed from the first draft, in which a character named Omril tortures it. Smith also inserted a continuity reference to 1980's Meglos upon reading its script. Bidmead and Nathan-Turner encouraged other continuity references to season 15's The Invasion of Time and the season 16's The Key To Time arc to develop the Doctor and Romana's approach to their situation. The production team issued rehearsal scripts on 30 May. Nathan-Turner did not like Smith's title for the serial, leading Bidmead to reissue the scripts with the new title Full Circle on 19 June, displeasing Smith. The new title was worked into Decider Draith's last words in Part One to clue the audience in on Alzarius' process of evolution. The serial's ending gained a new scene in which the Doctor shows the Deciders how to activate the Starliner, replacing an ending in which Adric is explicitly shown stowing on board the TARDIS as its scanner shows the Marshmen returning to the swamp. On 2 June, Peter Grimwade was chosen to direct the serial. Grimwade was a friend of Nathan-Turner's, and had worked as a production assistant on six prior serials. More recently, he had been hired as a writer for the show on a planned serial called Xeraphin, later produced as Time-Flight.

=== Design and effects ===
Amy Roberts, who had previously worked on the serial Image of the Fendahl (1977), was brought on as costume designer, Francis Needham and Janet Budden, both new to the show, were chosen for make-up and set design respectively. Visual effects were assigned to John Brace, who had worked as effects assistant on various serials for the show. Roberts and Brace each produced a design for the Marshman costumes, which were tested on location by Marshman actor Barney Lawrence on 21 July. Grimwade ultimately selected Roberts' design, eight of which were created for the serial. Although initially imagined as cavemen-like by Smith, Roberts' Marshmen costumes were aquatic in appearance, with latex decorations suggesting seaweed and shells and also functioning as wetsuits. The costume incorporated masks with a fibreglass underskull over a rubber skull cap, surgical gloves, and rubber slippers. Two actors passed out from the heat of the Marshmen costumes both in studio and on location. The costumes for the two extras playing swimming Alzarians were changed from thongs to more substantial clothing at Nathan-Turner's request.

The visual effects department, under Brace, developed multiple variants of Marshspider props, including a twelve-inch one with glowing eyes which could pop out of a fruit on a rod, one string puppet for a close-up, and twenty five-inch spiders made of latex, which would move by being pulled across the floor. Three battery-powered spiders that could "walk" through the use of an internal pulley system were also designed; they also featured moving fangs and glowing eyes. The effect of Romana's blue and green veins after being bitten by the spiders would be accomplished by Scotchlite make-up which would reflect the colored lights. The effects of Mistfall would be produced on location with dry ice and a wind machine, which the effects team experimented with on the morning of the first shoot day.

Grimwade, inspired by the use of CSO on the 1977 serial The Robots of Death, opted to screen model corridors into the background of Starliner interior scenes to increase the illusion of depth. The corridor set was able to be redressed as an entrance hatch and a lower section of the ship through which the Marshmen would enter. The production team obtained permission to use overhead lighting arrays to raise and lower doors and hatches on the Starliner set.

=== Casting ===
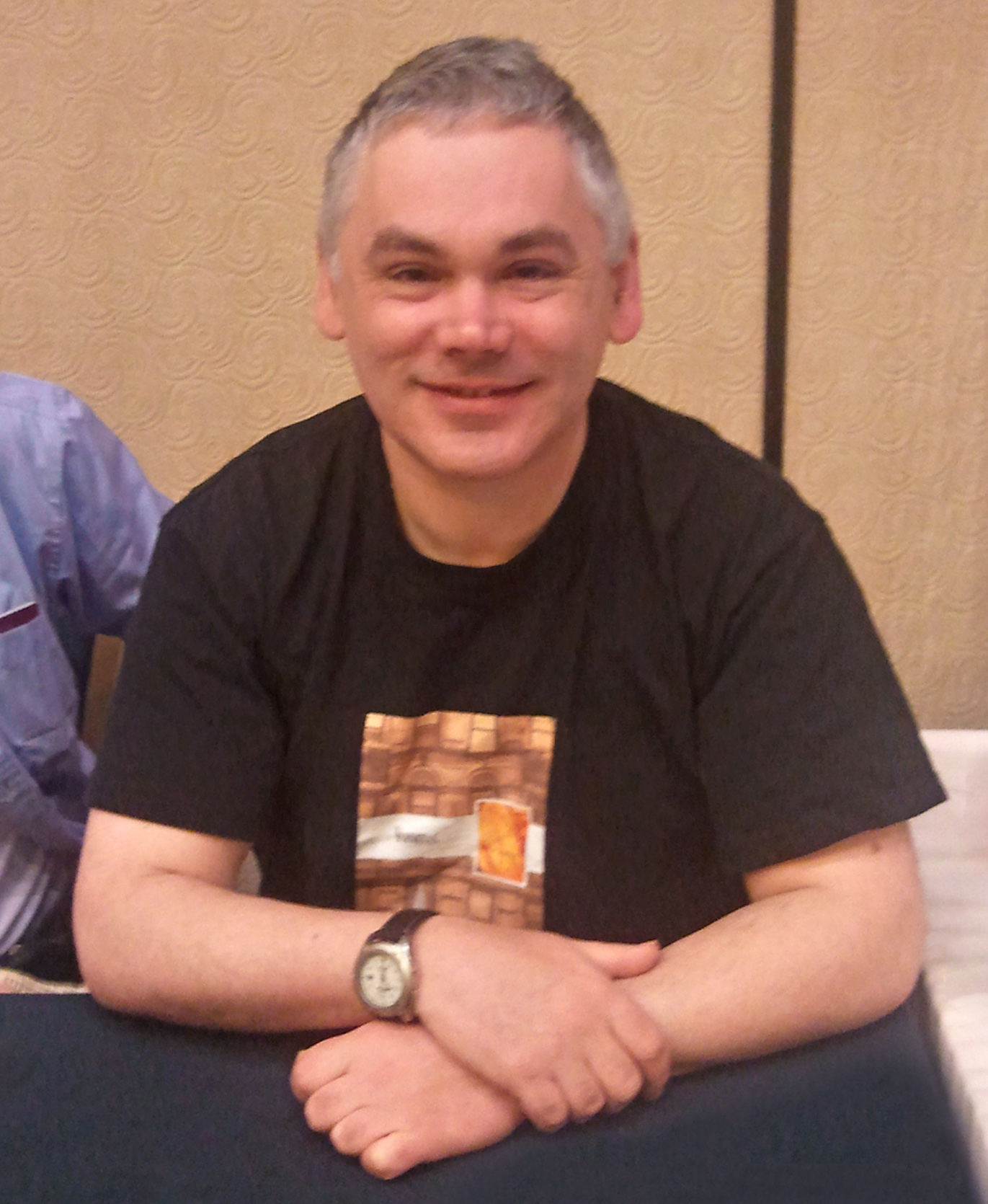
Matthew Waterhouse was a longtime Doctor Who fan before being cast as Adric.

The character of Adric was first announced in the Evening News on 26 February. The outline for the character had described him as "about 15" and "wiry" with "short, straight black hair." The next month, Nathan-Turner cast Matthew Waterhouse in the role. Waterhouse was a former news clerk at the BBC and, like Smith, a longtime Doctor Who fan. Waterhouse was formerly the first correspondent for the fan magazine Doctor Who Weekly, and had once participated in a TV Action competition to design a monster for the show, debuting as an actor in the then-unreleased To Serve Them All My Days (1980). Although Full Circle introduces Adric, the first serial Waterhouse filmed was State of Decay. Waterhouse later stated that he was given the role without much preparation, claiming he had lunch with Nathan-Turner and sent "straight into rehearsals." Waterhouse competed for the role with a friend and fellow fan, Bernard Padden. After three auditions, Padden was disqualified for his strong Manchester accent, but was given the role of Outler Tylos, which Grimwade initially wanted to cast actor Billy McColl in.

Nathan-Turner approached film and television actor George Baker in the BBC's Rehearsal Rooms in Acton, asking him to play Login, an Alzarian citizen and later Decider whose daughter Keara is among the Outlers. Baker agreed, relating to the part due to his five daughters. Grimwade was responsible for much of the casting. Child performer June Page and The Feathered Serpent actor Richard Willis were cast as Keara and Varsh respectively; the two later married.

A number of actors had made previous appearances on the show. James Bree, cast as Decider Nefred, had appeared in The War Games (1969), whereas Alan Rowe, cast as Decider Garif, had appeared in The Moonbase (1967), The Time Warrior (1973–74), and Horror of Fang Rock (1977), on which he had worked with Grimwade, who initially wanted John Franklyn-Robbins in the role. Because of their matching green costumes, the three Decider actors were nicknamed "the Decider Sisters" on set. Despite hoping to cast Steve Kelly, Grimwade gave performer Barney Lawrence, who had been an extra on State of Decay, the role of the Marshman Leader. He also cast Norman Bacon, also a former extra on the show in The Sun Makers (1977), as the other main Marshman role, the Marshchild.

=== Filming ===
==== Location shooting ====
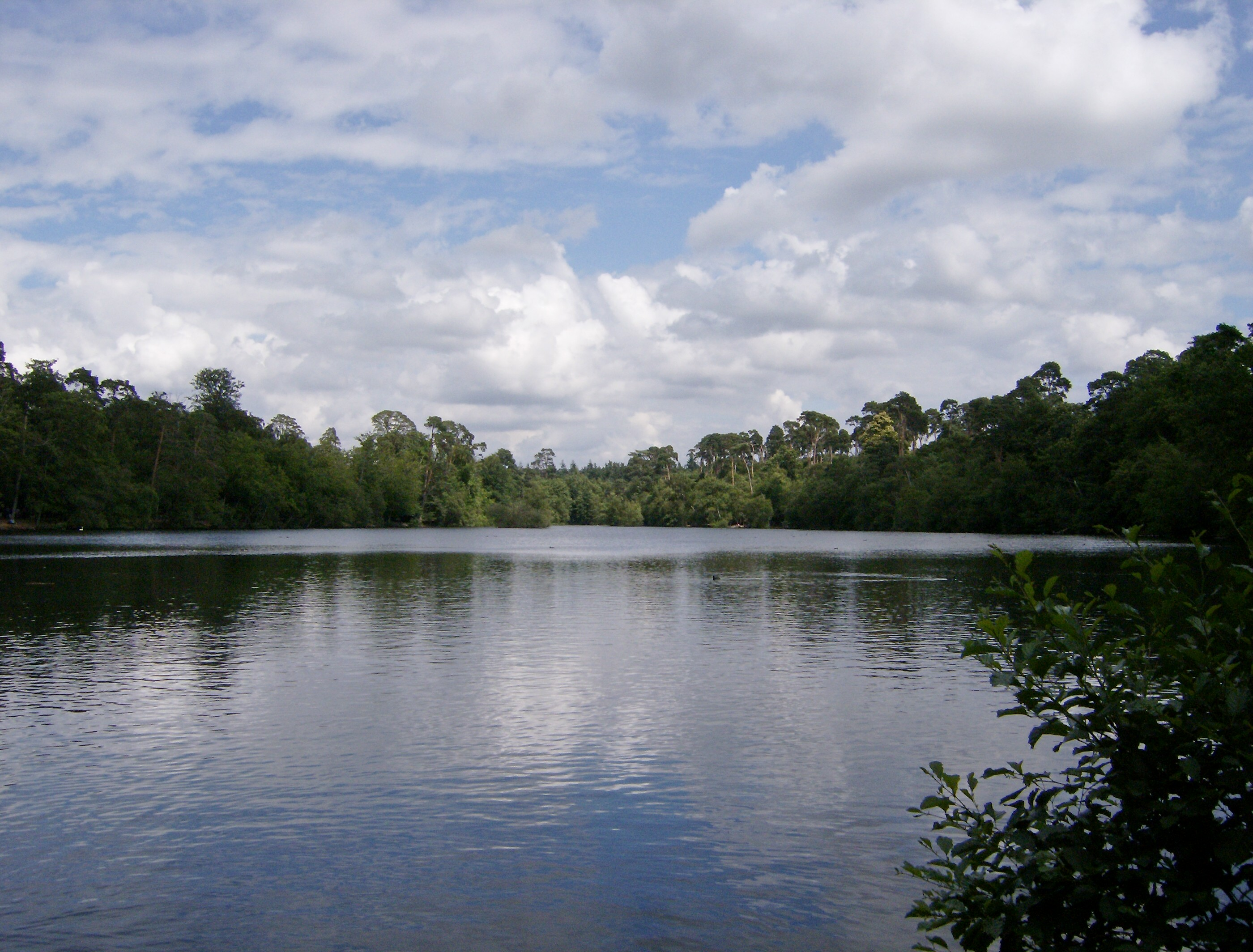
Three days of location shooting occurred at Black Park, Buckinghamshire, whose lake was used to depict swamps on Alzarius.

The cast first read through the script on 22 July at the Television Centre. Although Smith had been warned of Tom Baker's harsh reaction to scripts, Baker did not respond as dismissively as he usually did. The three-day 16mm location shoot began the next day at Black Park in Buckinghamshire, on the east side of the lake. The crew kept two local swimmers on standby for the scene featuring the swimming Alzarians and their rescue. Also filmed on the first day were the scenes of Decider Draith's address to the other Alzarians, Draith's conversation with Dexeter, and the attempted theft of riverfruit. Smith visited the location shoot, where he caught a virus and vomited on the costumes.

The next day, production shifted primarily to the lake's northern end and saw the filming of Draith's death, as well as the Alzarians walking to the Starliner. Draith's death was accomplished by dragging stuntman Stuart Fell into the lake with a wire pulled by frogmen. The third and final day of location shooting was mostly conducted in the park's woods, and comprised all the exterior scenes featuring the Marshmen and the regular cast. While filming its scenes in the afternoon, the radio-controlled K9 prop began to have difficulty moving, which controller Nigel Brackley discovered was a result of mud clogging its rubber treads. Grimwade waited until the sun was low in the sky to film the day's final scene of the Marshmen rising up from the swamp. Grimwade recorded two takes; on the second one, the Marshmen actors held weights under the water to prevent them from rising too quickly.

==== Studio shooting ====
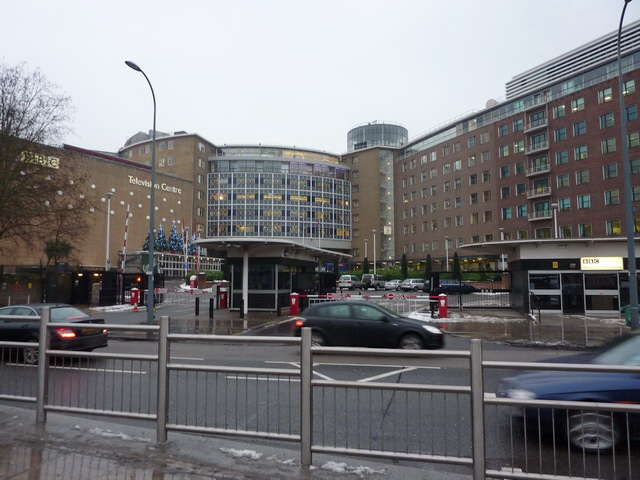
Studio filming began at the BBC Television Centre in London on 7 August 1980.

Studio rehearsals began the following Tuesday, 29 July at the Acton Rehearsal Rooms. A number of rewrites took place before the shoot resumed, including the removal of Login's cabin to avoid building another set and a reworking of the Marshchild scenes. On Thursday, 7 August, studio filming began at the Television Centre's Studio 3 with an evening session to record the scenes set in the TARDIS. Close-ups of Romana being possessed were also filmed, during which Lalla Ward's screaming kept distorting the tapes. The next day, the crew filmed scenes set in the Starliner's lower decks, followed by filming on the cave set, which proved longer and more complicated than anticipated. Due to the time constraints, Grimwade postponed the recording of scenes set in the Starliner corridors to the second block of production.

The following Monday, 11 August, rehearsals at Acton began again in preparation for the second shooting block, which began on 21 August, this time in Studio 6. The first evening session began with the scenes set in the Starliner's science unit. The session concluded with two more scenes in the cave, including the spiders attacking Romana. The next day's afternoon saw filming on the Great Book Room set, with model shots of the TARDIS and Starliner recorded that evening. On 23 August, the final day of filming, scenes set in the Starliner boarding area were shot, including Varsh's death and the Marshmen attacking, for which dry ice was used again. Waterhouse drew on his memory of his brother's suicide to play the scene of Varsh's death. The evening session saw the completion of the postponed corridor shots from the first block of filming.

Filming was complicated by Tom Baker's difficult behavior on set. While filming, Nathan-Turner asked Baker to redo a scene in which the Doctor chastises Adric, feeling Baker was acting too pleased. Baker asked Nathan-Turner if he should instead be playing Francis of Assisi, and began calling Nathan-Turner "the Vatican." Because of his frustration with the K9 prop, Baker carried its head around the studio, barking "woof-woof" during camera rehearsals, prompting Grimwade to intervene. On the final shoot day, Waterhouse, whose relationship with Baker had become particularly strained, responded to Baker's behavior by swearing at him. At one point during the production, Baker, due to his exhaustion and dissatisfaction with Nathan-Turner, first discussed with the producer about leaving the series. During both location and studio filming, a photographer from View-Master was on set to take photographs that could be viewed with the toy, unsettling some of the actors.

=== Post-production ===
The serial was edited from 28 August to 6 September. Several scenes were trimmed from Part Four, which overran, as well as one in Part One. Some shots of the Marshmen and Starliner were played in slow motion. Some of the visual effects were accomplished with Quantel 3000. A few lines, including Draith's dying words, were dubbed over. Grimwade also recorded two announcements playing in the Starliner himself. Last minute edits continued until 12 November. Radiophonic Workshop composer Paddy Kingsland wrote and produced the incidental soundtrack for the serial, having previously composed for State of Decay and Meglos. Kingsland, at Grimwade's suggestion, composed leitmotifs for each character, reusing Adric's from State of Decay. The soundtrack was realised using Yamaha SY2, Oberheim OB-X, and Roland Jupiter-4 synthesizers in addition to drums. Dick Mills, also of the Workshop, obtained the noises for the Marshmen by recording at a pig farm.

== Themes and influences ==
=== Themes ===
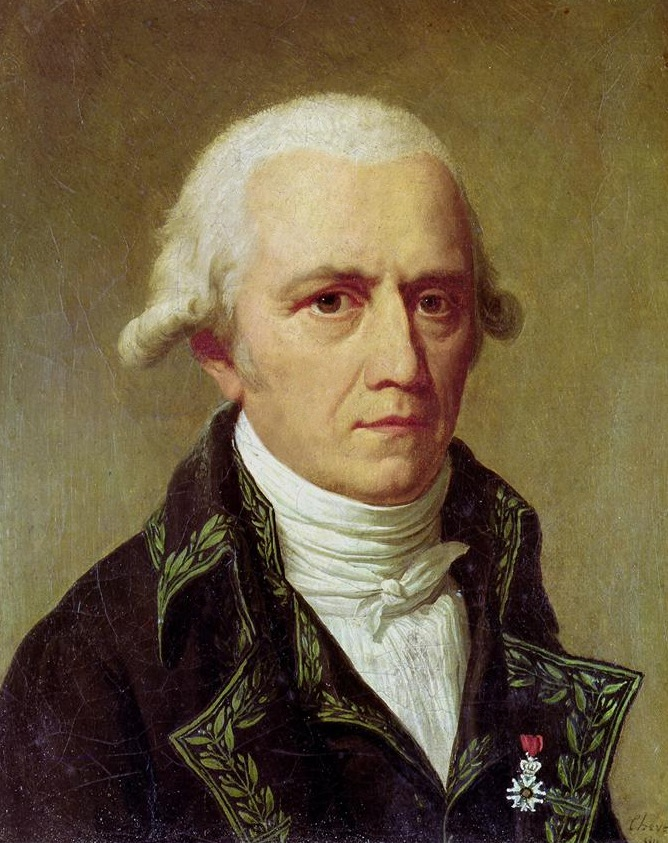
Critic John Toon writes that the serial's approach to evolution mirrors the pre-Darwin theories of Jean-Baptiste Lamarck.

Full Circle is conceptually and thematically concerned with the theory of evolution. John Toon, in a monograph on the serial, notes that the Doctor's function in the story mirrors that of Charles Darwin in Victorian Britain by upending the regime of the Deciders, who organize society around ritual and mystery. The serial's approach to evolution, however, owes more to the theory of Jean-Baptiste Lamarck that changes to an individualism during its lifetime would be inherited by its offspring. Lamarck's theory can be seen in the rapid and purposeful adaptation of the Marshmen from water to air.

Graham Sleight writes that Full Circle questions the difference between primitivism and civilization, and notes that the Alzarians have adopted "vast structures of deception" to deny their closeness to the animalistic Marshmen. As in several other of the show's storylines, this systemic deception is dismantled by scientific inquiry. The Alzarians are initially presented as a colonial people whose base is threatened by the indigenous Marshmen, an example of the fear of post-imperial "reverse colonialism" that was prevalent in many of Doctor Who's serials of the period, although this is subverted by the reveal that the Alzarians are themselves indigenous. Toon notes a contrast between the treatment of circular history in Full Circle and Warriors' Gate, the final serial of the E-Space trilogy. Whereas the Alzarians appear trapped in a cycle of repeating their history of domination by the ruling class, the Tharils in Warrior's Gate work to undo their past as slavers.

Some critics have noted religious overtones in Full Circle. Fan reviewer Martin Wiggins, writing soon after the serial's initial broadcast, observed parallels between the story and the Book of Exodus, noting that Mistfall mirrors Passover and that Decider Nefred's death before the Alzarians reach their final destination of Terradon is reminiscent of the death of Moses on the way to the Promised Land. During the serial's development, Bidmead compared the ritualistic maintenance of the Starliner to a form of cargo cult. Although the Alzarians have scientists, the Starliner society is organized around the mystical, "patrician" authority of the Deciders, who cloak the ship's function in mystery. A triangular motif in the Starliner's set design evokes an association with magic, mirroring the mystical presentation of the ship. Although science dispels the mystery of the Starliner and turns it into a tool, scientific inquiry is also shown to be untrustworthy and dangerous through Dexeter's failed operation on the Marshchild and the unreliability of the TARDIS scanner. This is further underlined by the failure of K9, who is destroyed and repurposed by the Doctor as a totemic mask to scare off the Marshmen.

=== Influences ===
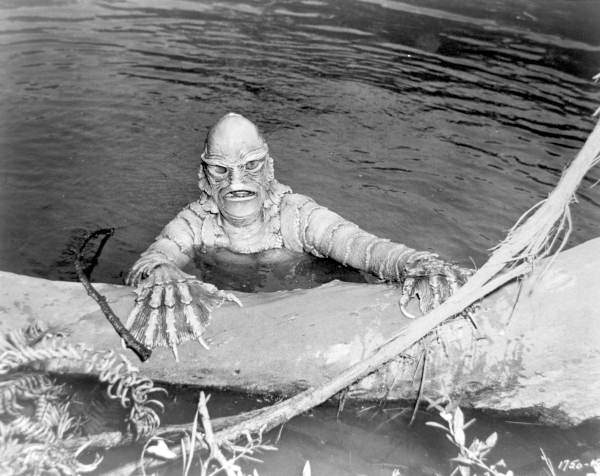
Many critics have compared the appearance of the Marshmen to the creature from Creature from the Black Lagoon (1954).

Critic John Muir notes that Full Circle's focus on a society that has forgotten its heritage has its antecedent in the season 14 serial The Face of Evil, and revisits the cliché of a world "descended into barbarism." Full Circle's narrative twist is the reverse of the reveal in The Face of Evil in which a primitive tribe is revealed to be descended from the crew of a spaceship. Muir also notes similarities between the serial and a 1975 episode of the science-fiction series Space: 1999 titled "The Full Circle", in which a group of men and women devolve into primitive cavemen after passing through a mist. The 1983 book Doctor Who: The Unfolding Text considers both Full Circle, as a "monster story", and the following serial, State of Decay, examples of Gothic influence in season 18. The concept of primitive aliens evolving to resemble space-faring colonists may have its origin in Gene Wolfe's The Fifth Head of Cerberus. Many critics have noted the similarities between the Marshmen's design and first appearance and the film Creature from the Black Lagoon, the title creature of which also derives its horror from being a "missing link" between humanity and the primitive. Toon suggests that the interconnectedness of Alzarius may have been inspired by the thesis of the 1979 book Gaia: A New Look at Life on Earth, which Bidmead may have been familiar with.

== Broadcast and reception ==
Episode	Title	Run time	Original release date	UK viewers (millions)
1	"Part One"	24:23	25 October 1980	5.9
2	"Part Two"	22:11	1 November 1980	3.7
3	"Part Three"	22:00	8 November 1980	5.9
4	"Part Four"	24:16	15 November 1980	5.5

Full Circle was broadcast on BBC1 in four weekly parts from 25 October to 15 November 1980. Although the first episode's viewership saw an uptick from the preceding serial, Meglos, the second's viewership of under four million was one of the lowest in the show's history. The remaining two episodes attracted a larger audience, but remained under six million, outside of the week's top 100. The serial competed for viewers with ITV's concurrent broadcast of Buck Rogers in the 25th Century. The final episode saw a decent Appreciation Index score of 65. The second and third episodes were followed by a promotion for a Doctor Who exhibit at Madame Tussauds.

Two days before the first episode was broadcast, the serial was advertised in Radio Times with an article playing up the youth of Smith and Waterhouse. Another article in the Daily Express also focused on the two teenagers. Waterhouse appeared in several interviews before and during the serial's broadcast, introducing the serial and character on Top of the Pops, BBC Radio Cymru, Playground for BBC Radio 1, and Multi-Colored Swap Shop. The latter two also promoted clips from the serial's first episode. The serial's broadcast came amid heavy media attention to the series, as Tom Baker announced his departure from the show the day before the first episodes aired, leading to frenzied speculation on who his replacement would be until the announcement of Peter Davison's casting on 4 November.

The serial was broadcast in the United States in May 1981, also airing as an 83-minute television movie. That summer, the serial was rebroadcast by the BBC from 3 to 6 August, airing one episode an evening from Monday to Thursday, although it did not air on BBC Cymru. The rebroadcast saw low ratings, although the second and fourth episodes exceeded the original viewership. It was bought by New Zealand the same year, and aired in Australia in the spring of 1982. It was screened in Brunei, Canada, Gibraltar, and Swaziland over the next two years before being reissued, after which it was further broadcast in Southeast Asia and the Middle East. UK Gold screened it episode-by-episode in May 1994, and from July screened a compilation form. BBC Prime rebroadcast it in the spring of 2000.

=== Critical response ===
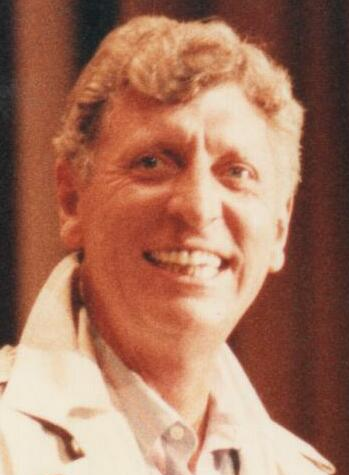
The dramatic performance of Tom Baker (pictured 1986) in the serial has been praised by both contemporary and retrospective reviewers.

Full Circle received mostly positive contemporary reviews, and was retrospectively characterized by writer Lance Parkin as "beloved" of fans at the time. Doctor Who Monthly, as Doctor Who Magazine was then titled, singled Grimwade's direction out for praise, particularly the scene of the Marshmen rising out of the swamp, and described the serial as "one of the best" in "a very long time." Peter Anghelides, in the fanzine TARDIS, wrote that "all the hopes of an excellent set of stories" in Season 18 were fulfilled by Full Circle, praising the serial's acting and "moving" and "not overly dramatic" death scenes. Martin Wiggins of Ark In Space, another fanzine, criticized the "ostentatious" continuity references. In The Doctor Who Review, Gary Hopkins praised Tom Baker and Lalla Ward's performances, particularly in the scene after the Marshchild's death. Hopkins also joined in praising Grimwade's direction and the "beautiful" reveal of the Marshmen at the end of Part One, and considered the spider effects generally convincing. In the fanzine Fendahl, reviewer Frank Danes considered the spider effects a failure, but said the character of Adric was "interesting."

Retrospective reviews have also been generally positive. Lawrence Miles and Tat Wood criticized the serial's dialogue and "obsessive continuity", but noted that the serial heralds a return to the series "taking itself seriously again." They singled out the mature drama of the Marshchild's death and Tom Baker's acting for praise, and wrote that the serial's design, theme, and direction suggest "a universe of layers and textures." Patrick Mulkern, writing a retrospective review in Radio Times, gave the serial five stars, writing that despite some "lackluster" casting, the serial affords Tom Baker "outstanding" material in his speech to the Deciders, and praising Grimwade's direction in the swamp sequences. Lance Parkin considered Full Circle "a mixed bag", with both "strong monster moments" and "terrible acting." Many critics commended the design of the Marshmen. Miles and Wood applauded the "attention to detail" in their design, favorably comparing their convincing appearance to a nature documentary, while Mulkern applauded them as the "most effective monsters in ages." Graham Sleight, in a book on Doctor Who's monsters, called the cliffhanger to Part One one of the series' best, "beautifully framed and lit" with "judicious use of slow motion." Peter Campbell, writing in Doctor Who: The Episode Guide, rates the serial 8 out of 10, calling it "stylish and confident", although criticizing the "irritating" Outlers and "a confused resolution." In a 2014 poll by Doctor Who Magazine, Full Circle was ranked 143rd out of 241 Doctor Who stories.

== Commercial releases ==
Full Circle
- Author: Andrew Smith
- Cover artist: Andrew Skilleter
- Series: Doctor Who book: Target novelisations
- Release number: 26
- Publisher: Target Books
- Publication date: 16 September 1982
- ISBN: 0-426-20150-7

A novelisation of the serial, written by Andrew Smith, was published by Target Books in September 1982. Smith used the novelisation to expand on several elements of the storyline and setting. Unlike the serial, the novelisation opens with the Starliner crashing on Alzarius. An audiobook of the Target novelisation was released on 29 January 2015, read by Waterhouse and Leeson.

Full Circle was released on VHS in October 1997 with the as part of a box set called The E-Space Trilogy. The DVD was released in January 2009 as part of a set of the same name. In April 2012, the serial was also released as part of issue 85 of the Doctor Who DVD Files. Paddy Kingsland's incidental music for the serial was released as part of the compilation album Doctor Who at the BBC Radiophonic Workshop Volume 4: Meglos & Full Circle in 2002. Two individual tracks, "K9 on a Mission" and "Summons to Gallifrey" were released on Doctor Who: The 50th Anniversary Collection in 2013. Sound effects for the serial have been released on Doctor Who: 30 Years at the BBC Radiophonic Workshop in 1993 and Doctor Who at the BBC Radiophonic Workshop Volume 3: The Leisure Hive in 2002. In 2019, the story was released on Blu-ray as part of the Doctor Who Collection Season 18 box set.

=== Audio sequel ===
In 2015, Big Finish Productions released an audio sequel to the serial as part of The Monthly Adventures range of Doctor Who audio dramas. The sequel, titled Mistfall and written by Smith, sees the Fifth Doctor (Peter Davison) and his companions enter E-Space and land on Alzarius 300 years later, where they meet an expedition from New Alzarius, a planet settled by the Starliner inhabitants after the events of Full Circle. Smith incorporated the concept of an intelligent Marshwoman named Fem from his original outline into the audio.

== Works cited ==
- Alvarado, Manuel; Tulloch, John (1983). Doctor Who: The Unfolding Text. New York: St. Martin's Press. ISBN 0-333-34847-8.
- Barnes, Alan (2019). "The Fact of Fiction: Full Circle". Doctor Who Magazine. No. 535. Panini Magazines. pp. 54–61.
- Booy, Miles (2012). Love and Monsters: The Doctor Who Experience, 1979 to the Present. Bloomsbury Publishing. ISBN 0857724584.
- Campbell, Peter (2007). Doctor Who: The Episode Guide (4th ed.). Herts : Pocket Essentials. ISBN 1842433555.
- Howe, David J.; Stammers, Mark; Walker, Stephen James (1998). Doctor Who: The Television Companion (1st ed.). London: Doctor Who Books. ISBN 0563405880.
- Miles, Lawrence; Wood, Tat (2004). About Time 5: The Unauthorized Guide to Doctor Who (Seasons 18 to 21). Mad Norwegian Press. ISBN 0-9759446-4-9.
- Muir, John Kenneth (1999). A Critical History of Doctor Who on Television. McFarland & Company. ISBN 9780786437160.
- Parkin, Lance (2009). Time Unincorporated: The Doctor Who Fanzine Archives. Vol. 1. Mad Norwegian Press. ISBN 9781935234012.
- Scott, Cavan; Wright, Mark (2013). Who-ology: The Official Miscellany (1st ed.). BBC Books. ISBN 978-1-84990-619-7.
- Sleight, Graham (2012). The Doctor's Monsters: Meanings of the Monstrous in Doctor Who. London: I.B. Tauris & Co. ISBN 978-1-84885-178-8.
- Toon, John (2018). Full Circle. The Black Archive (2nd ed.). Obverse Books.
- Wright, Mark, ed. (2017). The Leisure Hive, Meglos, Full Circle. Doctor Who: The Complete History. Vol. 32. London: Panini Comics, Hachette Partworks. ISSN 2057-6048.
