= Christopher H. Bidmead =

English writer and journalist (1941–2025)

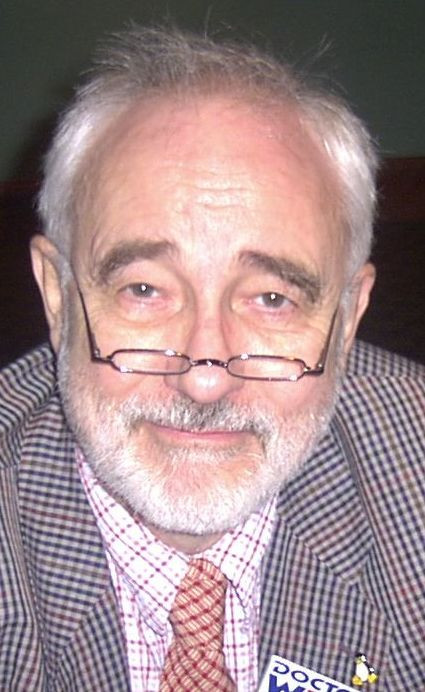
- Bidmead in 2003
- Born: 18 January 1941; Bolton, Lancashire, England
- Died: 6 August 2025 (aged 84)
- Occupations: Writer, journalist, actor
- Known for: Doctor Who

Christopher Hamilton Bidmead (18 January 1941 – 6 August 2025) was an English screenwriter, journalist, and actor, best known for his work as the script editor on the eighteenth season of Doctor Who from 1980 to 1981. His brief tenure on the series saw the departure of Tom Baker as the Fourth Doctor and a return to a focus on education and hard science fiction.

Bidmead was born in Bolton and trained as an actor at the Royal Academy of Dramatic Art. After a career in repertory theatre in several cities, he joined the Royal Shakespeare Company and later began acting in several radio plays on BBC Radio 4. Dissatisfied with the scripts he was receiving, Bidmead began writing his own, and also began contributing to a number of television shows. His interest in science also led him to write articles on computers for New Scientist magazine.

In 1979, writer Robert Banks Stewart recommended Bidmead to the Doctor Who production team as a replacement for departing script editor Douglas Adams. Bidmead joined at the same time as new producer John Nathan-Turner and set about turning the show away from what he saw as the excessively silly and fantastical storylines of Adams' tenure. Bidmead had few leftover scripts to work with, and encouraged the hiring of writers new to the series, including novelist Stephen Gallagher and 17 year-old fan Andrew Smith. Feeling overworked and undervalued, Bidmead left the series as script editor after one season. He continued to contribute several scripts to the series and to write for technology publications. He died in August 2025.

== Early life ==
Christopher Hamilton Bidmead was born on 18 January 1941 in Bolton, Lancashire. His family soon moved to London, despite the Blitz, where Bidmead grew up in Hampstead Garden Suburb. Bidmead grew up not knowing his mother well, as his parents divorced early in his life. He lived with his father, a part-time journalist and employee of a Swedish mining company. Bidmead attended Sizewell Hall, a progressive boarding school in Suffolk, where he first began acting, debuting in a production of The Wind in the Willows. He then attended Highgate School in London, where he developed an interest in science. Afterwards, Bidmead earned a scholarship to attend the Royal Academy of Dramatic Art from 1960 to 1962, hoping for success as an actor. In April 1962, he starred in a Royal Academy production of Measure for Measure as part of the Southwark Shakespeare Festival. That June, he played Boyet in a student production of Love's Labour's Lost, for which The Stage and Television Today praised his technique, and in July appeared as Rachel's son in Live Like Pigs by John Arden.

== Career ==
=== Acting career ===
Bidmead's early roles were in repertory theatre and touring universities as part of the Portable Theatre Company. In 1963, he also appeared in several productions at the Birmingham Repertory Theatre in Birmingham, including The Country Wife and Thark, acting alongside Julie Christie. In April, he played a young Sam Kindale in a production of Photo Finish by Peter Ustinov, for which the Coventry Evening Telegraph praised his "pleasing and intelligent" performance. In a review, The Stratford-Upon-Avon Herald commented that Bidmead was "worth watching" and predicted that he might "snap up the mantle recently cast down by Derek Jacobi." Bidmead also received notice for his portrayal of Paul in an October production of Colombe and a November production of Between These Four Walls.

The following year he landed roles at the Little Theatre, another repertory theatre in Bristol, where he starred in productions such as The Knack, The Days and Nights of BeeBee Fenstermaker, They Call the Bastard Stephen, and All In Good Time, the latter at the Theatre Royal. His performance in The Knack was praised by the Birmingham Daily Post as "closely in sympathy with the character." He moved again to another theatre in 1965, performing in productions in Leatherhead, including as the lead in Tom Jones. The Surrey Advertiser and County Times called his performance "quite delightful" and adept at "taking the audience into his confidence." Later that year he was cast as Dr. Lomax in the soap opera Emergency Ward 10, but left the role to join the Royal Shakespeare Company in 1966, with whom he acted in The Revenger's Tragedy, Twelfth Night, Henry IV, and Hamlet, in which he played Fortinbras opposite David Warner. Bidmead's performance as Prince John in Henry IV received several positive reviews, while his portrayal of Sebastian in Twelfth Night opposite Diana Rigg was criticised by the Coventry Evening Telegraph as too weak and "frail-looking," but positively-noted by other reviewers.

From 1965, Bidmead acted in several productions for BBC Radio, acting in up to three plays a week as part of the Radio Drama Company by the end of the decade. In 1968, he was a reader on Story Time and Woman's Hour and the same year starred in Kill The Pharaoh!, a Victor Pemberton thriller. He played the role of Chris Wyatt on the soap opera Waggoner's Walk from 1970 to 1971. Although he enjoyed radio acting, Bidmead was dissatisfied with the quality of scripts he was receiving and soon began to write his own. He continued acting on stage, appearing in The Merchant of Venice at the Newcastle Playhouse in 1969, Look Back in Anger at the Richmond Theatre the same year, and The Rivals at the Nottingham Playhouse in 1971. In 1971, he played Laertes opposite Alan Bates in a West End production of Hamlet.

=== Writing career ===
Bidmead's frustration led him to write the six-part The Joke About Hilary Sprite, which centered on an intelligent, suicidal young woman hired by a spy agency, the story of which was inspired by Bidmead's poor mental health and relationship with the BBC. The BBC picked up the programme and it ran from June to July 1970 on BBC Radio 4, later being adapted for Canadian radio. He went on to write several more plays for BBC Radio, including Annabelle Alone in 1970, A Head Held High in 1971, and Perfect Working Order in 1975. In 1973, Bidmead began writing for television, contributing to Harriet's Back in Town and Rooms for Thames Television. After making an industrial film for International Computers Limited with Viscom, Bidmead became interested in the growing technology and began writing articles on computers for New Scientist magazine.

==== Doctor Who script editor (1980–1981) ====
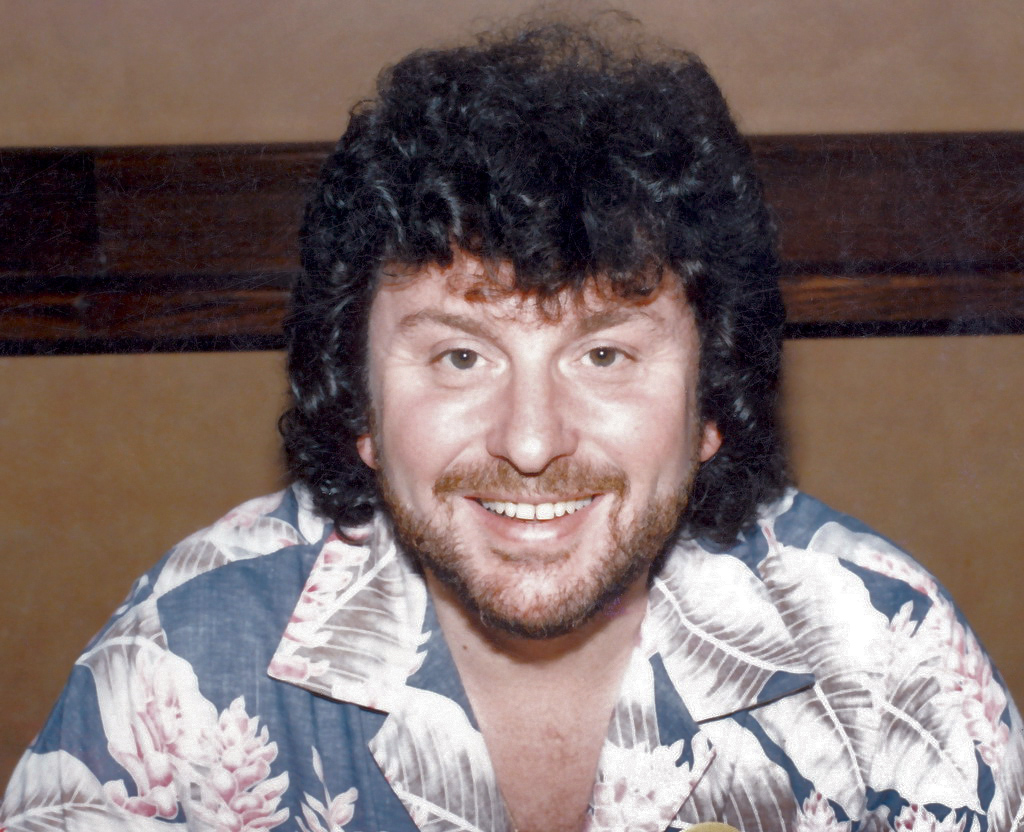
Producer John Nathan-Turner, alongside whom Bidmead joined Doctor Who

In 1979, Bidmead wrote what he later called a "fan letter" to Robert Banks Stewart, who had been a script editor on both Thames Television shows Bidmead had worked on, to congratulate him on his recent detective series Shoestring. Stewart had formerly written for the science fiction series Doctor Who, and was at the time being consulted by executive producer Barry Letts on the choice of a new script editor for the show to relace the outgoing Douglas Adams. Stewart, recalling Bidmead as a result of the letter, recommended him, particularly due to his writings in New Scientist. Bidmead initially declined the position, feeling the tone of the show was too silly, but accepted upon Letts' insistence that he was being hired to return the series to a more scientifically grounded, serious approach, as was new producer John Nathan-Turner. Bidmead aimed to reorient the show around a policy of "education, education, education." He opposed what he described as the series' non-scientific plot mechanics under Adams' tenure, which for him shaded into magic. Another element of the show he wished to de-emphasize was the tendency to base stories around myths and legends, as with the season 17's The Horns of Nimon. Bidmead also wished to return to narratives where the Doctor would be caught up in events around him, feeling that the show was trending towards having the character instigate most of the series' plotlines. To walk back the campy tone of the most recent seasons, Bidmead prepared a writer's guide and aimed to tone down the humor of star Tom Baker as the Fourth Doctor.

Upon taking the job, Bidmead had very few scripts left over from the previous production team. One, The Tearing of the Veil by Andy Drury, was deemed unusable, while another, The Vampire Mutation by former script editor Terrance Dicks, needed many rewrites. Dicks was called back in to rewrite the script, which eventually was produced as the serial State of Decay. Bidmead's emphasis on hard science came into conflict with Dicks' wish to write an archetypal vampire story, and encouraged Dicks to incorporate more scientific elements. Also left over was a spec storyline called The Planet That Slept, written by Andrew Smith, who, unbeknownst to Bidmead, was a 17-year-old fan of the series. Bidmead met with Smith and helped him develop the script for the serial Full Circle. Another holdover was Avalon, a script by David Fisher that began pre-production before Bidmead's hiring, eventually being produced as The Leisure Hive.

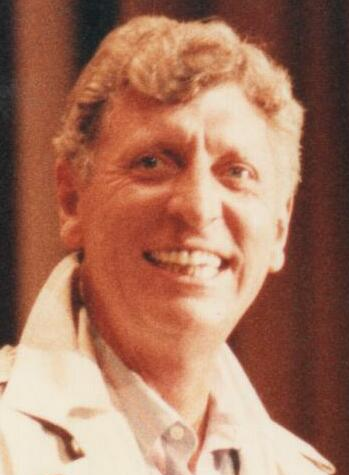
Conflicts with Nathan-Turner and Doctor Who star Tom Baker (pictured) contributed to Bidmead's decision to leave the series.

Bidmead also wished to attract more new writers to the show. One of these was Johnny Byrne, whom Bidmead had known as a poet in the 1970s without knowing Byrne wrote for television. Bidmead tracked Byrne down and commissioned him to write The Keeper of Traken, a serial inspired by the concept of millennialism. Bidmead also tried to commission science fiction writers who had not been involved with the show. He approached Quatermass creator Nigel Kneale to write a serial, but Kneale refused, telling Bidmead he would never "in a million years" write for the series, which he called a "piece of tat." His predecessor Adams had developed an idea for a four-part serial with science fiction novelist Christopher Priest, which was revived by Bidmead as Sealed Orders. When Priest withdrew, Bidmead replaced him with another science fiction novelist, Stephen Gallagher, whom he knew from the Radio 4 play An Alternative to Suicide, to write what became the serial Warriors' Gate. He also successfully engaged writers John Flanagan and Andrew McCulloch to develop a serial, which later became Meglos. To develop new talent, Bidmead suggested creating a mentorship programme where young fans with ideas for the series would be paired with legacy writers to develop storylines together, although the idea was vetoed by the BBC Copyright Detachment. Due to the inexperience of some new writers, Bidmead had to rewrite several scripts himself. In an interview, he recalled once reducing Terrance Dicks to tears upon requesting a rewrite. During Bidmead's tenure, the production team also made an unsuccessful effort to revive Shada, a Douglas Adams-penned serial whose filming was abandoned due to a strike.

Early in his tenure, Bidmead suggested linking together several serials into a larger narrative. Although Nathan-Turner was unsure about the proposition due to production problems on season 16's Key to Time arc, Bidmead was given permission to string together Full Circle, State of Decay, and Warriors' Gate into a loose trilogy where the Doctor becomes trapped in the universe of E-Space. Tom Baker's upcoming departure from the series led Nathan-Turner and Bidmead to develop another trilogy, whose second part would end the season on a cliffhanger. Although Bidmead initially did not want to write for the series himself, a lack of suitable scripts prompted him to agree to write the season finale, Logopolis. Bidmead suggested several replacements for the actor, among them several women, including Helen Mirren, but was shut down by Nathan-Turner. Feeling worn out by the job and not respected by Nathan-Turner and Baker, with whom he often clashed over changing his lines, Bidmead requested a 30% raise, which was denied. He left the position of script editor in December 1980, although continued to work on Logopolis. Antony Root was brought on to assist Bidmead and serve as interim script editor. Bidmead suggested Eric Saward to replace him full-time.

=== Later work ===
Bidmead contributed Castrovalva, the opening serial to season 19 of Doctor Who, after his departure as script editor. He remained involved with the programme, later writing the serial Frontios for the 1984 season. Another script, The Hollows of Time, was written for season 23 but abandoned following the series' 1985 hiatus. Bidmead contributed his last story, Pinacotheca, for season 23's Trial of a Time Lord arc, but had it suddenly dropped by the production team. The Hollows of Time was eventually adapted into an audio drama by Big Finish Productions in 2010, for whom Bidmead also storylined the production Renaissance of the Daleks in 2007. Bidmead also wrote novelisations of the three serials of his that made it to television, later narrating two of them as audiobooks, but declined to novelise Pinacotheca. Bidmead continued to write for technology publications, including PC Plus, Personal Computer World, Wired, and the website Tested Technology.

== Personal life and death ==
In 1987, Bidmead married his wife Rosalind Earlle, the daughter of comedian Freddie Earlle and a charity manager, with whom he had two children, Anne and Evie. He died on 6 August 2025, aged 84.

== Works cited ==
- Arnopp, Jason (2009). "Science Friction". Doctor Who Magazine. No. 407. pp. 42–47.
- Griffiths, Peter (1997). "Coming of Age". Doctor Who Magazine. No. 257. pp. 6–12.
- Cook, Benjamin (2019b). "Who Tells Your Story". Doctor Who Magazine. No. 536. pp. 38–43.
- Miles, Lawrence; Wood, Tat (2004). About Time 5: The Unauthorized Guide to Doctor Who (Seasons 18 to 21). Mad Norwegian Press. ISBN 0-9759446-4-9.
- Cook, Benjamin (2019a). "Who Lives, Who Dies". Doctor Who Magazine. No. 535. pp. 16–21.Wright, Mark, ed. (2017a). The Leisure Hive, Meglos, Full Circle. Doctor Who: The Complete History. Vol. 32. London: Panini Comics, Hachette Partworks. ISSN 2057-6048.
- Wright, Mark, ed. (2017b). State of Decay, Warriors' Gate, The Keeper of Traken, Logopolis. Doctor Who: The Complete History. Vol. 33. London: Panini Comics, Hachette Partworks. ISSN 2057-6048.

Preceded by Douglas Adams	Doctor Who Script Editor; 1980–81	Succeeded by Antony Root
