= Doctor Who at the BBC Radiophonic Workshop Volume 3: The Leisure Hive =

Compilation album by BBC Radiophonic Workshop
- Released: 2002
- Recorded: 1980
- Genres: Electronic music, Sound effects
- Length: 72:56
- Label: BBC Music
- Producer: Mark Ayres
- Compiler: Mark Ayres

BBC Radiophonic Workshop chronology
Doctor Who at the BBC Radiophonic Workshop Volume 2: New Beginnings 1970–1980 (2000)	Doctor Who at the BBC Radiophonic Workshop Volume 3: The Leisure Hive (2002)	Doctor Who at the BBC Radiophonic Workshop Volume 4: Meglos & Full Circle (2002)

Doctor Who soundtrack chronology
Music from the Tenth Planet (2000)	Doctor Who at the BBC Radiophonic Workshop Volume 3: The Leisure Hive (2002)	Doctor Who at the BBC Radiophonic Workshop Volume 4: Meglos & Full Circle (2002)

Doctor Who at the BBC Radiophonic Workshop Volume 3: The Leisure Hive is the third in a series of compilations showcasing the BBC Radiophonic Workshop's work on the science-fiction programme Doctor Who. The album focused mainly on the Peter Howell synthesiser score for the 1980 serial The Leisure Hive, which received its first full release here. The compilation also collected some Dick Mills sound effects from the story as well as some effects from other 1980 serials Meglos and Full Circle, whose music would be the subject of the fourth volume in the series. The final track was a new remix of the original Delia Derbyshire version of the show's theme tune by series compiler Mark Ayres.

== Background ==
The committee that oversaw the BBC Radiophonic Workshop limited the number of outside composers who were granted access to its equipment. Due to its close ties to dramatic productions rather than music, the workshop was basically closed to the contemporary musical community except those few "approved" composers, and these were admitted only after attending an orientation familiarizing the musicians with the equipment. One of those approved composers was Tristram Cary, who wrote music for Doctor Who, and their production team for the television series, "notoriously scraped by on the tiniest of budgets, and often relied on music to say what the visuals could not. Cary's abstract representations of desolate alien worlds says much more about their nature than cardboard sets ever could."

== Track listing ==
Track #	Artist	Track name	Stories used in
1	Peter Howell	"Doctor Who: Opening Theme"	various
2	Peter Howell	"Brighton Beach / K9 Kaput"	The Leisure Hive
3	Peter Howell	"Into Argolis"	The Leisure Hive
4	Peter Howell	"The Generator / Intruders"	The Leisure Hive
5	Peter Howell	"'His Time Has Come' / Earth Shuttle Arrives"	The Leisure Hive
6	Peter Howell	"Tachyon Terror"	The Leisure Hive
7	Peter Howell	"Into the Generator"	The Leisure Hive
8	Peter Howell	"The Hive / Mena Fades"	The Leisure Hive
9	Peter Howell	"Looking for Mr Brock"	The Leisure Hive
10	Peter Howell	"Testing Time"	The Leisure Hive
11	Peter Howell	"The Limitation Program"	The Leisure Hive
12	Peter Howell	"The West Lodge"	The Leisure Hive
13	Peter Howell	"The Child of the Generator"	The Leisure Hive
14	Peter Howell	"The Foamasi"	The Leisure Hive
15	Peter Howell	"The Argolin Dawn"	The Leisure Hive
16	Peter Howell	"'We, Pangol'"	The Leisure Hive
17	Peter Howell	"Re-creation"	The Leisure Hive
18	Peter Howell	"Rebirth"	The Leisure Hive
19	Peter Howell	"Back to Work"	The Leisure Hive
20	Peter Howell	"Doctor Who: Closing Theme"	various
21	Dick Mills	"Argolis Exterior Planet Atmosphere"	The Leisure Hive
22	Dick Mills	"Earth Shuttle Arriving"	The Leisure Hive
23	Dick Mills	"Generator Hall"	The Leisure Hive
24	Dick Mills	"Boardroom"	The Leisure Hive
25	Dick Mills	"Hologram"	The Leisure Hive
26	Dick Mills	"Corridor Background"	The Leisure Hive
27	Dick Mills	"Generator and Screen"	The Leisure Hive
28	Dick Mills	"Tachyon Drive Engaged"	The Leisure Hive
29	Dick Mills	"The Screens of Zolpha-Thura"	Meglos
30	Dick Mills	"Laboratory Ascends"	Meglos
31	Dick Mills	"Dodecahedron Energy Beams"	Meglos
32	Dick Mills	"Mistfall Mist"	Full Circle
33	Dick Mills	"Operating Room"	Full Circle
34	Dick Mills	"Starliner Instrument Panel"	Full Circle
35	Delia Derbyshire	"Doctor Who Theme" (Original Version, New Stereo Remix 2002) (remixed by Mark Ayres)	—N/a
Track listing:

== Equipment ==
Equipment used on this compilation includes:

- Yamaha CS-80
- Roland 100M

== Reception ==
American author Louis Niebur wrote in Notes that "Doctor Who at the BBC Radiophonic Workshop, Volume Three: The Leisure Hive, presents in its entirety Peter Howell's score for The Leisure Hive, a synthesizer score that attempts the repeat on a smaller scale the grandeur of Jean-Michel Jarre or Vangelis's contemporary popular music. The warmth of Howell's analog synthesizers, in a studio comprised of a Yamaha CS80, Roland Jupiter 4, 100M Modular, and an EMS Vocoder, radiates throughout the score, emulating the epic force of Gustav Holst's The Planets. Moving away from the alien dissonance of Malcom Clarke's Sea Devils sound, Howell's tonality nevertheless mirrors the 'science fiction' nature of the program through its use of 'futuristic' electronic timbres."

== See also ==
- Music from the BBC Radiophonic Workshop
- List of Doctor Who music releases
