= Doctor Who at the BBC Radiophonic Workshop Volume 4: Meglos & Full Circle =

Compilation album by BBC Radiophonic Workshop
- Released: 2002
- Recorded: 1980
- Genre: Electronic music
- Length: 77:28
- Label: BBC Music
- Producer: Mark Ayres
- Compiler: Mark Ayres

BBC Radiophonic Workshop chronology
Doctor Who at the BBC Radiophonic Workshop Volume 3: The Leisure Hive (2002)	Doctor Who at the BBC Radiophonic Workshop Volume 4: Meglos & Full Circle (2002)	Music from the BBC Radiophonic Workshop (2003)

Doctor Who soundtrack chronology
Doctor Who at the BBC Radiophonic Workshop Volume 3: The Leisure Hive (2002)	Doctor Who at the BBC Radiophonic Workshop Volume 4: Meglos & Full Circle (2002)	Devils' Planets – The Music of Tristram Cary (2003)

Doctor Who at the BBC Radiophonic Workshop Volume 4: Meglos & Full Circle is the final installment in the Mark Ayres compiled series of releases of BBC Radiophonic Workshop music. It featured music, by Peter Howell and Paddy Kingsland, for the 1980 Doctor Who serials Meglos and Full Circle. It was the first full releases of both scores, although some sound effects from the serials appeared on the previous volume.

== Track listing ==
Track #	Artist	Track name	Stories used in
1	Peter Howell	"Doctor Who: Opening Theme"	various
2	Paddy Kingsland	"Burnout on Walkway 9"	Meglos
3	Paddy Kingsland	"The Deons"	Meglos
4	Paddy Kingsland	"K9 Repaired"	Meglos
5	Paddy Kingsland	"The Screens of Zolpha-Thura"	Meglos
6	Paddy Kingsland	"The Last Zolpha-Thuran"	Meglos
7	Paddy Kingsland	"Chronic Hysteresis"	Meglos
8	Peter Howell	"To Tigella"	Meglos
9	Peter Howell	"The Deon Oath"	Meglos
10	Peter Howell	"The Power Room"	Meglos
11	Peter Howell	"The Bell Plants"	Meglos
12	Peter Howell	"Meglos"	Meglos
13	Peter Howell	"'She's Seen Too Much!'"	Meglos
14	Peter Howell	"The Dodecahedron"	Meglos
15	Peter Howell	"The Ultimate Impossibility"	Meglos
16	Peter Howell	"The Deons Take Command"	Meglos
17	Peter Howell	"Earthling"	Meglos
18	Peter Howell	"Sacrifice"	Meglos
19	Peter Howell	"Other Lives to Save"	Meglos
20	Peter Howell	"Countdown"	Meglos
21	Paddy Kingsland	"Summons to Gallifrey"	Full Circle
22	Paddy Kingsland	"Alzarius / The Outlers"	Full Circle
23	Paddy Kingsland	"The System Files / Adric"	Full Circle
24	Paddy Kingsland	"Mistfall"	Full Circle
25	Paddy Kingsland	"The Starliner"	Full Circle
26	Paddy Kingsland	"Decider Deceased"	Full Circle
27	Paddy Kingsland	"Adric Finds the TARDIS"	Full Circle
28	Paddy Kingsland	"Starliner Sealed"	Full Circle
29	Paddy Kingsland	"The Giants Leave the Swamp"	Full Circle
30	Paddy Kingsland	"K9 on a Mission / Third Decider"	Full Circle
31	Paddy Kingsland	"TARDIS Taken"	Full Circle
32	Paddy Kingsland	"The Marshchild / K9 Loses His Head"	Full Circle
33	Paddy Kingsland	"The Spiders I"	Full Circle
34	Paddy Kingsland	"The Spiders II"	Full Circle
35	Paddy Kingsland	"A Little Patience"	Full Circle
36	Paddy Kingsland	"Romana Comatose"	Full Circle
37	Paddy Kingsland	"The Bookroom"	Full Circle
38	Paddy Kingsland	"The Experiment"	Full Circle
39	Paddy Kingsland	"The Work of Maintenance"	Full Circle
40	Paddy Kingsland	"Marshmen I"	Full Circle
41	Paddy Kingsland	"Blue Veins"	Full Circle
42	Paddy Kingsland	"Marshmen II"	Full Circle
43	Paddy Kingsland	"No Return"	Full Circle
44	Paddy Kingsland	"Oxygen"	Full Circle
45	Paddy Kingsland	"Full Circle / The Deciders Decide"	Full Circle
46	Peter Howell	"Doctor Who: Closing Theme"	various

== Equipment ==
Equipment used on this compilation includes:

- Yamaha CS-80
- EMS Vocoder
- Roland Jupiter-4
- Roland CR-78
- Oberheim OB-X
- Yamaha SY-2

== Reception ==
In his review for Notes, Louis Niebur opined that the score "written in 1980 during the recording of his music for Hitchhiker's Guide to the Galaxy, Full Circle betrays the popular tendencies of Paddy Kingsland's style in his use of the electric guitar and a Roland CR78 drum machine, but the characteristic sounds of the Roland SY2 and Oberheim OBX synthesizers also give his tracks that distinctive 'space age' quality. As Doctor Who's music gained prominence in the show's production, so the scores themselves grew in ambitiousness, becoming more cinematic."

== See also ==
- Music from the BBC Radiophonic Workshop
- List of Doctor Who music releases
