= Doctor Who season 18 =

1980–81 season of British sci-fi TV series

Doctor Who
- Season 18
- Cover art of the Blu-ray release for the complete season
- Starring: Tom Baker; Lalla Ward; John Leeson; Matthew Waterhouse; Sarah Sutton; Janet Fielding
- No. of stories: 7
- No. of episodes: 28

Release
- Original network: BBC1
- Original release: 30 August 1980 – 21 March 1981

Season chronology
- ← Previous; Season 17 Next → Season 19

The eighteenth season of British science fiction television series Doctor Who consisted of seven four-episode serials broadcast from 30 August 1980 with the serial The Leisure Hive, to 21 March 1981 with the serial Logopolis. The season is Tom Baker's final as the Fourth Doctor before his regeneration into the Fifth Doctor (Peter Davison), as well as Lalla Ward's as companion Romana II and John Leeson's as the voice of K9. For the second time (The first being during Season 4 and third being Season 21), the entire main cast changed over the course of a single season. The season also sees the debut of Matthew Waterhouse as Adric, Sarah Sutton as Nyssa, and Janet Fielding as Tegan Jovanka, the three of whom would remain regular companions into the Fifth Doctor's era, as well as the return of the Master, portrayed both by Geoffrey Beevers and Anthony Ainley.

The season was the first to be produced by John Nathan-Turner, who would produce every season of the show until 1989, and the first to feature script editor Christopher H. Bidmead. The season features a trilogy of connected serials, Full Circle, State of Decay, and Warrior's Gate, which form a trilogy set in a "bubble universe" called E-Space, as well as The Keeper of Traken and Logopolis, the first two serials of a trilogy continued in season 19's Castrovalva, centred on the return of The Master and the regeneration of the Fourth Doctor.

== Cast ==
=== Main cast ===
- Tom Baker as the Fourth Doctor
- Lalla Ward as Romana
- John Leeson as Voice of K9 (Note: Spelt "K.9" in the credits of Meglos and Full Circle)
- Matthew Waterhouse as Adric
- Sarah Sutton as Nyssa
- Janet Fielding as Tegan Jovanka

Season 18 is the final season of Tom Baker as the Fourth Doctor after seven years in the role. New companions Adric (Matthew Waterhouse), Nyssa (Sarah Sutton), and Tegan Jovanka (Janet Fielding) make their introductions in Full Circle, The Keeper of Traken, and Logopolis, respectively. Romana, played by Lalla Ward, departs from the series in Warriors' Gate, along with John Leeson who returns to voice the robot K9. With the arrival of Adric, this season marks the first time since 1967 that the Doctor has three regular travelling companions in the TARDIS. Peter Davison makes his first appearance as the Fifth Doctor in the closing moments of Logopolis.

=== Guest stars ===
The Master returned to the show, this time played by Geoffrey Beevers, in The Keeper of Traken. After the events of Traken, the Master was thereafter played by Anthony Ainley, who would continue in the part for the rest of the classic series' run.

Jacqueline Hill, who had played the First Doctor's companion Barbara Wright, returned in Meglos, although playing a different character, the alien priestess Lexa.

== Serials ==
For Season 18 John Nathan-Turner replaces Graham Williams as producer. Barry Letts returns now as executive producer, for just this season. Christopher H. Bidmead also replaces Douglas Adams as script editor. In a return to the format of early seasons, virtually all serials from Seasons 18 through 20 are linked together, often running directly into each other. Three serials – Full Circle, State of Decay, and Warriors' Gate – are part of a trilogy within the season. These three serials include the arrival of Adric and the departure of Romana and K9.

Over the period of Christmas 1980, the season took a two-week transmission break between the broadcasts of State of Decay and Warriors' Gate.

No. story	No. in season	Serial title	Episode titles	Directed by	Written by	Original release date	Prod. code	UK viewers (millions)	AI
109	1	The Leisure Hive	"Part One"	Lovett Bickford	David Fisher	30 August 1980	5N	5.9	—
109	1	The Leisure Hive	"Part Two"	Lovett Bickford	David Fisher	6 September 1980	5N	5.0	—
109	1	The Leisure Hive	"Part Three"	Lovett Bickford	David Fisher	13 September 1980	5N	5.0	—
109	1	The Leisure Hive	"Part Four"	Lovett Bickford	David Fisher	20 September 1980	5N	4.5	65
In search of a holiday, the Doctor and Romana travel to the famous Leisure Hive on Argolis, a planet ravaged by a nuclear war with the reptilian Foamasi years earlier. The main attraction of the Hive is a device called the Tachyon Recreation Generator, but when things start to go mysteriously wrong with the machine, the Doctor realises that evil is afoot in the Hive. He and Romana begin to unearth a tangled conspiracy which may lead to a new, deadlier war between the Argolins and the Foamasi.
110	2	Meglos	"Part One"	Terence Dudley	John Flanagan & Andrew McCulloch	27 September 1980	5Q	5.0	61
110	2	Meglos	"Part Two"	Terence Dudley	John Flanagan & Andrew McCulloch	4 October 1980	5Q	4.2	64
110	2	Meglos	"Part Three"	Terence Dudley	John Flanagan & Andrew McCulloch	11 October 1980	5Q	4.7	—
110	2	Meglos	"Part Four"	Terence Dudley	John Flanagan & Andrew McCulloch	18 October 1980	5Q	4.7	63
The Doctor is summoned back to the planet Tigella, where the population is divided along religious and scientific lines. Something is going terribly wrong with Tigella's main power source, the Dodecahedron, but the Savants are prevented from investigating by the zealous Deons. To make matters worse, before the Doctor can solve the problem with the Dodecahedron, he is accused of its theft. The true culprit is Meglos, a shapeshifting Zolfa-Thuran, who intends to unleash the full might of the Dodecahedron upon the universe.
111	3	Full Circle	"Part One"	Peter Grimwade	Andrew Smith	25 October 1980	5R	5.9	—
111	3	Full Circle	"Part Two"	Peter Grimwade	Andrew Smith	1 November 1980	5R	3.7	—
111	3	Full Circle	"Part Three"	Peter Grimwade	Andrew Smith	8 November 1980	5R	5.9	—
111	3	Full Circle	"Part Four"	Peter Grimwade	Andrew Smith	15 November 1980	5R	5.4	65
Romana is recalled to Gallifrey, but en route the TARDIS is drawn through a Charged Vacuum Emboitment into another universe, called E-Space. Landing on the planet Alzarius, the Doctor meets a group of humans who are trying to rebuild their spacecraft which crashlanded generations ago. When Marshmen begin rising from the swamps during the dreaded time of Mistfall, however, the Doctor realises that there is something amiss on Alzarius, and begins to unravel a genetic riddle which stretches back centuries.
112	4	State of Decay	"Part One"	Peter Moffatt	Terrance Dicks	22 November 1980	5P	5.8	—
112	4	State of Decay	"Part Two"	Peter Moffatt	Terrance Dicks	29 November 1980	5P	5.3	—
112	4	State of Decay	"Part Three"	Peter Moffatt	Terrance Dicks	6 December 1980	5P	4.4	—
112	4	State of Decay	"Part Four"	Peter Moffatt	Terrance Dicks	13 December 1980	5P	5.4	69
Still trapped in E-Space, the TARDIS materialises on a medieval planet. The townsfolk live in fear of the Three Who Rule, who govern from their mighty castle. Investigating, the Doctor discovers that the Three Who Rule are ancient astronauts who were turned into vampires long ago, and their castle is actually their spaceship. When Romana and Adric are kidnapped, the Doctor must ally himself with a band of renegade peasants to stop the resurrection of one of Gallifrey's greatest enemies: the Great Vampire itself.
113	5	Warriors' Gate	"Part One"	Paul Joyce & Graeme Harper (uncredited)	Stephen Gallagher	3 January 1981	5S	7.1	59
113	5	Warriors' Gate	"Part Two"	Paul Joyce & Graeme Harper (uncredited)	Stephen Gallagher	10 January 1981	5S	6.7	—
113	5	Warriors' Gate	"Part Three"	Paul Joyce & Graeme Harper (uncredited)	Stephen Gallagher	17 January 1981	5S	8.3	—
113	5	Warriors' Gate	"Part Four"	Paul Joyce & Graeme Harper (uncredited)	Stephen Gallagher	24 January 1981	5S	7.8	59
Trying to escape from E-Space, the Doctor, Romana, Adric and K9 instead land in an eerie white void whose only feature is a crumbling old keep. Also trapped in the void is a slave ship captained by the cruel Rorvik, whose time sensitive pilot, the leonine Tharil Biroc, escapes and lures the Doctor into the keep and the mirror gateway beyond. There, the Doctor witnesses the rise and fall of the once-mighty Tharil Empire. He realises that he must free the Tharils enslaved on the ship and escape through the gateway, before Rorvik's vengeful actions destroy them all.
114	6	The Keeper of Traken	"Part One"	John Black	Johnny Byrne	31 January 1981	5T	7.6	—
114	6	The Keeper of Traken	"Part Two"	John Black	Johnny Byrne	7 February 1981	5T	6.1	—
114	6	The Keeper of Traken	"Part Three"	John Black	Johnny Byrne	14 February 1981	5T	5.2	—
114	6	The Keeper of Traken	"Part Four"	John Black	Johnny Byrne	21 February 1981	5T	6.1	63
The Union of Traken is governed by a Keeper gifted with the powers of the Source. The current Keeper is nearing the end of his thousand-year tenure, however, and asks the Doctor and Adric – who have escaped from E-Space – to go to Traken and stop an evil he believes is plotting to destroy the Union. But the source of the evil, the Melkur, has already infiltrated the Consuls of Traken, and has the Doctor declared a criminal. Allying himself with Consul Tremas and his daughter, Nyssa, the Time Lord must uncover the true power behind the Melkur – someone who knows the Doctor of old.
115	7	Logopolis	"Part One"	Peter Grimwade	Christopher H. Bidmead	28 February 1981	5V	7.7	—
115	7	Logopolis	"Part Two"	Peter Grimwade	Christopher H. Bidmead	7 March 1981	5V	7.7	61
115	7	Logopolis	"Part Three"	Peter Grimwade	Christopher H. Bidmead	14 March 1981	5V	5.8	—
115	7	Logopolis	"Part Four"	Peter Grimwade	Christopher H. Bidmead	21 March 1981	5V	6.1	65
After her aunt is murdered by the Master, an airline stewardess named Tegan Jovanka becomes an unwitting stowaway aboard the TARDIS as it travels to the planet Logopolis. There, the Doctor discovers that the Master's interference with the Logopolitans' advanced mathematics has unleashed a wave of entropy which threatens to consume the entire universe. The two Time Lords enter into an uneasy alliance. Their only hope lies on Earth... but then, in the moment of greatest crisis, the Master plays his ultimate trump card.

== Production ==
=== Scrapped stories ===
A story by James Follett, Into the Comet, would have seen a race of monsters attacking a race of beings who live inside Halley's Comet, unaware that there is anything beyond it, was pitched but not pursued further by the development team. Sealed Orders, by Christopher Priest, was commissioned and would have involved trips back and forth in time on Gallifrey, resulting in multiple TARDISs and another Doctor, with one being killed. Invasion of the Veridians was pitched by Nabil Shaban, who also propositioned himself as a potential successor for the role of the Doctor following Baker's departure, though this went nowhere. Song of the Space Whale, by Pat Mills and John Wagner, went through numerous drafts, and was later attempted to be repurposed for the show's twentieth season to introduce companion Vislor Turlough, though disagreements led to it getting scrapped again. It would ultimately be entirely scrapped by 1985.

Other scrapped stories include The Dogs of Darkness by Jack Gardner, Farer Nohan by Andrew Stephenson, Mark of Lumos by Keith Miles, Mouth of Grath by Malcolm Edwards and Leroy Kettle, Romanoids by Geoff Lowe, The Psychonauts by David Fisher, and Soldar and the Plastoids by John Bennett.

== Broadcast ==
The entire season was broadcast from 30 August 1980 to 21 March 1981, but with a three week break between the fourth and fifth serials from 13 December 1980 to 3 January 1981.

== Home media ==
=== VHS releases ===
Season	Story no.	Serial name	Duration	Release date		
Season	Story no.	Serial name	Duration	UK	Australia	USA / Canada
18	109	The Leisure Hive	4 × 25 min.	January 1997	September 1997	May 1997
18	110	Meglos	4 × 25 min	March 2003	June 2003	October 2003
18	111; 112; 113	The E-Space Trilogy; Full Circle; State of Decay; Warriors' Gate	12 × 25 min	November 1997; 3 × VHS	October 1997; 3 × VHS	July 1998; 3 × VHS
18	114	The Keeper of Traken	4 × 25 min	June 1993	September 1993	February 1994
18	115	Logopolis	4 × 25 min	March 1992	September 1992	October 1993

=== DVD and Blu-ray releases ===
All releases are for DVD unless otherwise indicated:

- ^{(B)} indicates a Blu-ray release

Season	Story no.	Serial name	Duration	Release date		
Season	Story no.	Serial name	Duration	R2	R4	R1
18	109	The Leisure Hive	4 × 25 min.	5 July 2004	7 October 2004	7 June 2005
18	110	Meglos	4 × 25 min.	10 January 2011	20 January 2011	11 January 2011
18	111–113	Full Circle; State of Decay; Warriors' Gate	12 × 25 min. (Note: Known collectively as The E-Space Trilogy. Each serial comprises four episodes.)	26 January 2009	9 April 2009	5 May 2009
18	114	The Keeper of Traken (Note: Only available as part of the New Beginnings box set in Regions 2 and 4. Available individually or in the box set in Region 1.)	4 × 25 min.	29 January 2007	7 March 2007	5 June 2007
18	115	Logopolis (Note: Available as part of the New Beginnings box set or the Regeneration box set in Region 2. Only available as part of the New Beginnings box set in Region 4. Available individually or as part of the New Beginnings box set in Region 1.)	4 × 25 min.	29 January 2007	7 March 2007	5 June 2007
18	109–115	Complete Season 18 (Note: Released as Doctor Who: The Collection – Season 18 in Region B. Released as Doctor Who – Tom Baker: Complete Season Seven in Region A.)	28 × 25 min. 1 × 50 min.	18 March 2019 ^{(B)}	17 April 2019 ^{(B)}	19 March 2019 ^{(B)}

== In print ==
Season	Story no.	Library no. (Note: Number in Target's Doctor Who Library, if applicable)	Novelisation title	Author	Hardcover release date (Note: Published by Target's parent companies (Allen Wingate, W. H. Allen, BBC Books) unless otherwise indicated)	Paperback release date (Note: Published by Target Books (or by BBC Books under the Target Collection umbrella) unless otherwise indicated)	Audiobook	
Season	Story no.	Library no.	Novelisation title	Author	Hardcover release date	Paperback release date	Release date (Note: Unabridged from BBC Audio / AudioGo unless otherwise indicated)	Narrator
18	109	39	Doctor Who and the Leisure Hive	David Fisher	22 July 1982		1 July 2013	Lalla Ward
18	110	75	Meglos	Terrance Dicks	17 February 1983	19 May 1983	1 July 2021	Jon Culshaw (Note: K9 voice performed by John Leeson)
18	111	26	Full Circle	Andrew Smith	16 September 1982		15 January 2015	Matthew Waterhouse
18	112	—N/a	State of Decay (Note: Original novelisation exclusive to audio)	Terrance Dicks	—N/a		June 1981 (Note: Published by Pickwick Talking Books)	Tom Baker
18	112	58	Doctor Who and the State of Decay	Terrance Dicks	17 September 1981	14 January 1982	7 January 2016	Geoffrey Beevers
18	113	71	Doctor Who and Warriors' Gate	Stephen Gallagher (as John Lydecker) (Note: Print version of the expanded edition is credited solely to Gallagher)	15 April 1982		—N/a	
18	113	—N/a	Warriors' Gate (Note: Expanded and restored original version as submitted to Target before John Nathan-Turner demanded that it match the transmitted version more closely. Print version is titled Warriors' Gate and Beyond as it includes two short stories.)	Stephen Gallagher (as John Lydecker)	—N/a	13 July 2023	4 April 2019	Jon Culshaw
18	114	37	Doctor Who and the Keeper of Traken	Terrance Dicks	20 May 1982		1 October 2020	Geoffrey Beevers
18	115	41	Logopolis	Christopher H. Bidmead	21 October 1982		4 February 2010	Christopher H. Bidmead
