= The Leisure Hive =

109 – The Leisure Hive
- Doctor Who serial

Cast
- Doctor: Tom Baker – Fourth Doctor
- Companions: Lalla Ward – Romana; John Leeson – Voice of K9
- Others: Laurence Payne – Morix; Adrienne Corri – Mena; David Haig – Pangol; John Collin – Brock; Nigel Lambert – Hardin; Martin Fisk – Vargos; Roy Montague – Guide; David Allister – Stimson; Ian Talbot – Klout; Andrew Lane – Foamasi; Harriet Reynolds – Tannoy Voice; Clifford Norgate – Generator Voice

Production
- Directed by: Lovett Bickford
- Written by: David Fisher
- Script editor: Christopher H. Bidmead
- Produced by: John Nathan-Turner
- Executive producer: Barry Letts
- Music by: Peter Howell
- Production code: 5N
- Series: Season 18
- Running time: 4 episodes, 25 minutes each
- First broadcast: 30 August 1980
- Last broadcast: 20 September 1980

Chronology
← Preceded by Shada (unbroadcast); The Horns of Nimon (broadcast)	Followed by → Meglos

The Leisure Hive is the first serial of the 18th season of the British science fiction television series Doctor Who, which was first broadcast in four weekly parts on BBC1 from 30 August to 20 September 1980. It marks the return of John Leeson as the voice of K9.

In the serial, a criminal organisation of alien Foamasi, called the West Lodge, attempt to buy the planet Argolis from the Argolin people there as a West Lodge base. Meanwhile, the young Argolin Pangol (David Haig) seeks to start a war against the Foamasi, to whom his people had previously lost, with an army made of clones of himself.

== Plot ==
The Fourth Doctor and Romana visit the Leisure Hive of Argolis, a holiday complex built by surviving Argolins after their war with the Foamasi. The Leisure Hive is facing bankruptcy and the Earth agent, Brock, and his lawyer, Klout, have arrived with an offer to buy the planet. However, the offer is from the Foamasi and the Argolin board will not consider it.

The main tourist attraction is the Hive’s Tachyon Recreation Generator, which can duplicate and manipulate organic matter by the manipulation of tachyons. During a demonstration, a human tourist is killed due to sabotage. Earth scientist Hardin has been experimenting with tachyons to rejuvenate people. Mena, the Argolin chairman, brings Hardin to Argolis to help save her people from deteriorating. She has the Doctor and Romana help with his work. The time travellers know Hardin has been faking his work, but Romana feels that the experiments should have worked.

Romana and Hardin work on the time experiments; Mena volunteers to be the first to test it, but the Doctor is selected instead. The machine malfunctions while he is inside and he emerges an old man. Mena's son, Pangol, orders that the Doctor and Romana be confined.

Brock and Klout bring a new offer from an organisation called West Lodge. While tearing up the offer, that Pangol reveals the reason he is the only young Argolin in the Hive. He was the only successful child from a cloning experiment using the Recreation Generator. Driven by hatred of the Foamasi all aliens, he lusts for a war-forged empire.

The Doctor, Romana, and Hardin find Foamasi agents in the Hive and escort them to the council chamber. The agents reveal Brock and Klout are Foamasi impersonators and West Lodge is a criminal group. With the leader, Brock, captured, the organisation will fold and the Foamasi prepare to take the rogues for trial. Pangol refuses to let them pass and rallies the Argolins to his cause. The Doctor takes the Randomiser from the TARDIS and attaches it to the Recreation Chamber, hoping to destabilise the mechanism.

Romana fails to dissuade Pangol from using the Generator, he uses it to create an army of Tachyon replicas and orders Romana taken outside. Hardin finds Mena dying and carries her to the Generator. As Romana is taken, the clones are revealed to be merely tachyon images of a rejuvenated Doctor. She and the real Doctor return to the Generator Room.

Pangol, enraged that the Doctor has foiled his attempt to create an army, reenters the Generator. The Doctor reveals that he set the machine to "rejuvenate," and it cannot be stopped. Mena exits rejuvenated, holding Pangol, who has regressed to a baby. The Foamasi agents reappear, revealing that the West Lodge criminals tried to escape in the shuttle. Against Romana's advice, the Doctor leaves the Argolins and Foamasi to make up and the Randomiser attached to the Recreation Generator, thus leaving the TARDIS vulnerable to the Black Guardian.

== Production ==
Episode	Title	Run time	Original release date	UK viewers (millions)
1	"Part One"	23:33	30 August 1980	5.9
2	"Part Two"	20:45	6 September 1980	5.0
3	"Part Three"	21:21	13 September 1980	5.0
4	"Part Four"	21:19	20 September 1980	4.5

Working titles for this story included The Argolins and Avalon. Writer David Fisher conceived of the Foamasi as a race of criminals. "Foamasi" is a near-anagram of "mafioso". The episode was written as a satire of the decline of tourism in the United Kingdom in the 1970s. The alien costume used for the Foamasi was later reused in the 1981 BBC The Hitchhiker's Guide to the Galaxy as the leader of the G'Gugvuntt.

A new TARDIS prop is introduced in this episode which replaces the one used since The Masque of Mandragora (1976). This prop would be used right until the end of the original series' production in 1989. The Randomiser, which had been introduced in The Armageddon Factor, was ditched in Part Four of this story. This was also the first story to use the Quantel DPE 5000 digital image processing system. Filming on the story ran badly over budget. The opening sequence on Brighton beach is John Nathan-Turner's paean to Visconti's celebrated 1971 feature film, Death in Venice.

The episode and season is also the first to feature a more modern musical score including the use of synthesizers a marked change from the acoustic arrangements from the past. This was in part due to perceived similarities with Blake's 7.

=== Format changes ===
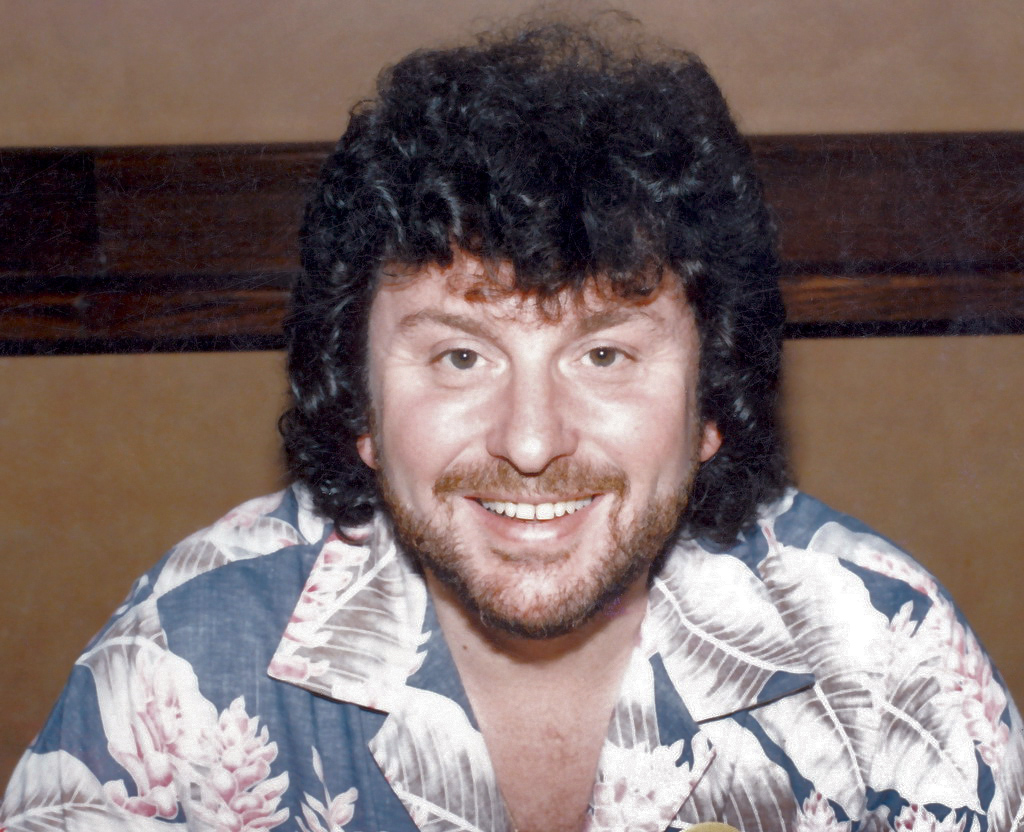
John Nathan-Turner began his nine-year tenure as Doctor Who producer and introduced many controversial changes to the show

The Leisure Hive introduced a new title sequence and logo, marking a significant departure from previous designs

This was the first Doctor Who story which John Nathan-Turner produced. Nathan-Turner was keen to get away from what he considered the excessive silliness of recent Doctor Who stories, and wanted to increase the series' production values, because he felt that they were poor when compared with glossy American science-fiction series. Among the changes Nathan-Turner instituted was the scaling back of K9's appearances (the unit is out of commission for most of this serial), eventually writing the character out in Warriors' Gate. Nathan-Turner would produce Doctor Who until 1989.

In a further attempt to update the image of the series, a significant change was made to the opening and closing title sequences. At Nathan-Turner's behest, Bernard Lodge's slit-scan titles, which had run virtually unaltered since the opening of season 12 in 1974, were replaced with a new animated starfield sequence. Nathan-Turner thought that Lodge's "time tunnel" animation resembled "a view through a vacuum cleaner tube", and commissioned Sid Sutton to design new titles. Sutton's approach was to depict a journey through space, and created a sequence of moving stars gathering into a constellation form, which morphed into a head shot of Tom Baker as the Doctor. Sutton also designed a new a new neon tubing-style logo to replace Lodge's diamond-shaped programme logo that had been in use since 1973. Delia Derbyshire's 1963 arrangement of Ron Grainer's theme music was also replaced by a more contemporary-sounding synthesizer arrangement by Peter Howell.

There were also costume changes which caused disagreement among the cast and crew. Tom Baker, Lalla Ward, Barry Letts, and Christopher H. Bidmead all protested against John Nathan-Turner's decision to add question-marks to Baker's shirts, arguing that it was gimmicky. Baker in particular was unhappy with it and told Nathan-Turner that it was "annoying, absurd, and ridiculous", while Bidmead later called it "a silly, quite absurd gimmick really". Bidmead, who found working with Tom Baker "difficult to say the very least", supposedly told Baker and Nathan-Turner during recording of The Leisure Hive that exclamation marks would have been more appropriate for Baker's shirts. The Seventh Doctor Sylvester McCoy would later protest against his question-mark adorned jumper in similar terms, but the question-mark motif would remain until the end of the classic series in 1989. Baker also disliked his new scarf, requesting that his old multi-coloured one be re-instated, but expressed gratitude to costume designer June Hudson for refusing to adhere to Nathan-Turner's demands to ditch the trademark scarf altogether and managing to find a compromise.

The show's stars took exception to many of John Nathan-Turner's other changes as well, with Tom Baker and Lalla Ward criticising the change in theme music and opening titles. Baker also criticised the new synthesised incidental music, comparing it unfavourably to Dudley Simpson's earlier scores. Ward later complained that Nathan-Turner had "removed all the lovely humour", while Baker said that he wanted the scripts to improve and regain some of the quality of the Philip Hinchcliffe era, as he felt that the quality of the scripts and storylines had declined under Graham Williams. He later said that he felt such improvements did not by and large occur, and that most of Nathan-Turner's changes were either cosmetic or misguided. Many of the new special effects introduced in this story were never used again to the extent on display here.

=== Cast notes ===
Laurence Payne had previously played Johnny Ringo in The Gunfighters (1966) and later played Dastari in The Two Doctors (1985). Nigel Lambert would later voice the 'Priest Triangle' in "War of the Sontarans" and "Once, Upon Time".

== Commercial releases ==
=== In print ===
Doctor Who and the Leisure Hive
- Author: David Fisher
- Cover artist: Andrew Skilleter
- Series: Doctor Who book: Target novelisations
- Release number: 39
- Publisher: Target Books
- Publication date: 22 July 1982
- ISBN: 0-426-20147-7

David Fisher's novelisation was published by Target Books in July 1982. It keeps many elements of the original script that were intended as a spoof on the Mafia. The original name of Argolis is given as Xbrrrm.

=== Home media ===
The Leisure Hive was released on VHS in January 1997, on DVD in July 2004, and as part of the Doctor Who DVD Files (issue 98) in October 2012. Peter Howell's incidental music was released as part of the compilation album Doctor Who at the BBC Radiophonic Workshop Volume 3: The Leisure Hive in 2002.
