= Doctor Who: Devils' Planets – The Music of Tristram Cary =

Soundtrack album by Tristram Cary
- Released: 2003
- Genre: Soundtrack
- Length: 2:30:39
- Label: BBC Music
- Producer: Mark Ayres

Doctor Who soundtrack chronology
Doctor Who at the BBC Radiophonic Workshop Volume 4: Meglos & Full Circle (2002)	Devils' Planets – The Music of Tristram Cary (2003)	Original Television Soundtrack (2006)

Doctor Who: Devils' Planets – The Music of Tristram Cary is a compilation of music by Tristram Cary for the television series Doctor Who. It features all the musical contributions Cary did for Doctor Who except for his music for Marco Polo (which no longer exists) and "The Ballad of the Last Chance Saloon" from The Gunfighters which was left off due to space reasons. The ballad eventually saw commercial release on the TV soundtrack release of that serial. Due to the folding of the BBC Music label, this album was available only for a limited period and now fetches high prices on auction sites such as eBay.

== Track listing ==
All music composed by Tristram Cary except where noted

Track #	Track name	Episodes used in
Disc One
The Daleks (1963)
1	"Doctor Who" (Original Theme)^{[a]}	various
2	"Forest Atmosphere"	"The Dead Planet"
3	"Skaro: Petrified Forest Atmosphere" ("Thal Wind")^{[b]}	"The Dead Planet"
4	"Forest with Creature"	"The Dead Planet"
5	"City Music 1 & 2"	"The Dead Planet"
6	"Thing in Jungle"	"The Dead Planet"
7	"City Music 3"	"The Dead Planet"
8	"Dalek City Corridor"^{[b]}	"The Dead Planet"
9	"The Daleks"	"The Dead Planet"
10	"Radiation Sickness"	"The Survivors"
11	"Dalek Control Room"^{[b]}	"The Survivors"
12	"The Storm"	"The Survivors"
13	"The Storm Continued (Susan meets Alydon)"	"The Escape"
14	"Inside the City"	"The Escape"
15	"The Fight"	"The Ambush"
16	"The Ambush"	"The Ambush"
17	"Fluid Link"	"The Ambush"
18	"Rising Tension"	"The Expedition"
19	"Demented Dalek"	"The Expedition"
20	"The Swamp"	"The Expedition"
21	"The Cave"	"The Ordeal"
22	"Barbara Loses the Rope"	"The Ordeal"
23	"Captives of the Daleks"	"The Ordeal"
24	"Heartbeats (Antodus falls)"	"The Ordeal"
25	"The Cave II"	"The Rescue"
The Daleks' Master Plan (1965)
26	"A Strange Sickness"	"The Nightmare Begins"
27	"Kembel I"	"The Nightmare Begins"
28	"Sting I"	"The Nightmare Begins"
29	"Kembel II"	"The Nightmare Begins"
30	"Daleks I"	"The Nightmare Begins"
31	"Kembel III"	"The Nightmare Begins"
32	"Daleks II"	"The Nightmare Begins"
33	"Daleks at the TARDIS"	" Day of Armageddon"
34	"Zephon"	" Day of Armageddon"
35	"Sting II"	" Day of Armageddon"
36	"Pyroflames"	" Day of Armageddon"
37	"Walls of Fire"	" Day of Armageddon"
38	"At the City Walls"	" Day of Armageddon"
39	"Taranium"	" Day of Armageddon"
40	"Zephon Raises the Alarm"	" Day of Armageddon"
41	"Leaving Kembel"	"Devil's Planet"
42	"Acceleration"	"Devil's Planet"
43	"Zephon's Demise"	"Devil's Planet"
44	"Desperus"	"Devil's Planet"
45	"The Screamers"	"Devil's Planet"
46	"Leaving Desperus"	"The Traitors"
47	"Sting III/Requiem for Katrina"	"The Traitors"
48	"Bret Vyon"	"The Traitors"
49	"Traitor"	"The Traitors"
50	"Counter Plot"	"Counter Plot"
51	"The Experiment"	"Counter Plot"
52	"Molecular Dissemination"	"Counter Plot"
53	"Limbo"	"Counter Plot"
54	"Mira"	"Counter Plot"
55	"Invisible Creatures"	"Counter Plot"
56	"The Daleks Have Won!"	"Coronas of the Sun"
57	"Invisible Creatures Attack"	"Coronas of the Sun"
58	"Taking the Dalek Ship"	"Coronas of the Sun"
59	"A New Threat"	"Coronas of the Sun"
60	"Fake Taranium"	"Coronas of the Sun"
61	"Return to Kembel"	"Coronas of the Sun"
62	"Gravity Force"	"Coronas of the Sun"
63	"At the Police Station"	"The Feast of Steven"
64	"At the Movie Studio"	"The Feast of Steven"
65	"The Victim I"	"Volcano"
66	"The Victim II"	"Volcano"
67	"The Victim III"	"Volcano"
68	"Lava"	"Volcano"
69	"The Monk"	"Volcano"
70	"Ancient Egypt"	"Golden Death"
71	"Dalek Time Machine"	"Golden Death"
72	"The Overseer and the Captain"	"Golden Death"
73	"Daleks at the Pyramids"	"Golden Death"
74	"Daleks vs Egyptians"	"Golden Death"
75	"The Doctor Searching"	"Golden Death"
76	"Escape"	"Golden Death"
77	"The Missing TARDIS"	"Golden Death"
78	"The Tomb"	"Escape Switch"
79	"The Mummy"	"Escape Switch"
80	"From Egypt to the Ice Planet"	"Escape Switch"
81	"Council in Uproar"	"The Abandoned Planet"
82	"The Core"	"The Abandoned Planet"
83	"Master of the Universe"	"The Abandoned Planet"
Disc Two
The Daleks' Masterplan (cont.)
Track #	Track name	Episodes used in
1	The Heart of the Mountain	"Destruction of Time"
2	"Growing Menace"	"Destruction of Time"
3	"City Music"	"Destruction of Time"
4	"The Time Destructor"	"Destruction of Time"
5	"The Destruction of Time"	"Destruction of Time"
6	"Daleks Disintegrate"	"Destruction of Time"
The Mutants (1972)
7	I	"Episode One"
8	II	"Episode One"
9	III	"Episode One"
10	IV	"Episode One"
11	V	"Episode One"
12	VI	"Episode One"
13	VII	"Episode Two"
14	VIII	"Episode Two"
15	IX	"Episode Two"
16	X	"Episode Two"
17	XI	"Episode Two"
18	XII	"Episode Two" & "Episode Three"
19	XIII	"Episode Three"
20	XIV	"Episode Three"
21	XV	"Episode Three"
22	XVI	"Episode Three"
23	XVII	"Episode Three"
24	XVIII	"Episode Three"
25	XIX	"Episode Three" & "Episode Four"
26	XX	"Episode Four"
27	XXI	"Episode Four"
28	XXII	"Episode Four"
29	XXIII	"Episode Four"
30	XXIV	"Episode Four"
31	XXV	"Episode Four"
32	XXVI	"Episode Four"
33	XXVII	"Episode Four"
34	XXVIII	"Episode Five"
35	XXIX	"Episode Five"
36	XXX	"Episode Five"
37	XXXI	"Episode Five"
38	XXXII	"Episode Five"
39	XXXIII	"Episode Five" & "Episode Six"
40	XXXIV	"Episode Six"
41	XXXV	"Episode Six"
42	XXXVI	"Episode Six"
43	XXXVII	"Episode Six"
44	XXXVIII	"Episode Six"
45	XXXIX	"Episode Six"
46	Doctor Who: Closing Theme^{[a]}	various

^a Composed by Ron Grainer, realised by Delia Derbyshire (BBC Radiophonic Workshop)
^b Special Sounds by Brian Hodgson (BBC Radiophonic Workshop)

== Album Credits ==
- Original recordings produced by Tristram Cary
- Stereo Reduction of The Mutants by Tristram Cary, 2002
- Compiled, produced and digitally remastered for compact disc by Mark Ayres
