= Viscom =

Viscom AG
- Type: German stock corporation (AG)
- Industry: Mechanical engineering
- Founded: 1984
- Headquarters: Hanover, Germany
- Key people: Dr. Martin Heuser; Carsten Salewski; Dirk Schwingel
- Revenue: € 118.780 million (2023)
- Number of employees: 600 worldwide (31 December 2023)
- Website: www.viscom.com

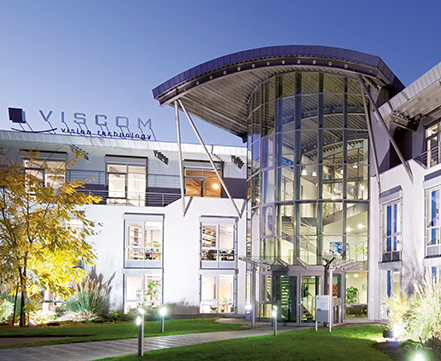
Viscom Headquarters in Hanover, Germany

Viscom AG is a manufacturer of inspection technologies, in particular for automatic optical inspection (AOI) and X-ray inspection, with headquarters in Hanover, Germany, used in automotive electronics, entertainment electronics, telecommunications and industrial electronics.

== History ==
Viscom was founded in 1984 by Dr. Martin Heuser and Volker Pape as a developer of software for image processing. After relocating to its current location in the Badenstedt district of Hanover in 1992, the company began serial production of inspection systems for electronics. In 1995 Viscom established another of its main pillars with the introduction of microfocus X-ray inspection and the first system worldwide to combine inspection under incident light and X-ray. In 1998 subsidiaries were founded in the United States and Singapore, and a worldwide network of sales representatives was created. In 2001 Viscom tapped into yet another business sector with the introduction of its microsystem inspection. In the same year, the company changed its corporate form to a German stock corporation (AG) before its initial listing on the stock market in May 2006. In 2012 Viscom developed the one-of-a-kind XM camera sensor technology, which is still used in AOI systems to this day. Viscom achieved record sales in 2017. Co-founder Volker Pape was elected to the Supervisory Board on June 1, 2018, naming Carsten Salewski the new Director of Sales/Operations. International expansion continued in 2021 with the establishment of subsidiaries in Bangalore, India, and Huizhou, China. In 2022, Exacom GmbH was founded for the development and sale of machines for the X-ray inspection of battery cells.

== Corporate Structure ==
The following companies are branches of Viscom AG:

- Viscom France S.A.R.L., Paris, France
- Viscom Tunisie S.A.R.L., Tunis, Tunisia
- Viscom Inc., Duluth, GA, USA
- Viscom Inc., San José, CA, USA
- Viscom Inc., Austin, TX, USA
- Viscom Inc., Zapopan, Mexico
- Viscom Machine Vision Pte Ltd., Singapore
- Viscom Machine Vision Trading Co. Ltd., Shanghai, China
- VICN Automated Inspection Technology (Huizhou) Co. Ltd., Huizhou City, Guangdong province, China
- Viscom Machine Vision (India) Pvt. Ltd., Bangalore, India
- Exacom GmbH, Hanover, Germany

Viscom also operates application and service centers around the globe.

== Products ==
Viscom's product range comprises six core areas:

- Optical serial inspection systems for solder paste inspection (3D SPI), placement monitoring and solder joint inspection (3D AOI)
- X-ray inspection systems for performing inline or manual solder joint inspections on printed circuit boards and on large and heavy performance electronics (3D AOI/AXI, MXI)
- Special X-ray inspection systems designed for the non-destructive testing of materials (NDT) and for 3D microfocus computed tomography (μCT)
- Optical and X-ray wire bond inspection
- Conformal coating inspection
- X-ray systems for the inspection of energy storage devices
