= Andrew Smith (Scottish writer) =

Scottish writer (born 1962)

- Born: 27 July 1962 (age 64); Scotland
- Occupations: Screenwriter, playwright, author
- Known for: Doctor Who

Andrew Smith (born 27 July 1962) is a Scottish screenwriter, playwright and author, best known for his work with the BBC science fiction television series Doctor Who.

== Career ==
At the age of 17, Smith achieved his ambition to write for Doctor Who with Full Circle, the third serial of the 18th season. Working titles for this story included The Planet That Slept. It broadcast in four weekly parts on BBC1 from 25 October to 15 November 1980. A novelisation of this serial, written by Smith, was published by Target Books in September 1982.

After limited success in television, Smith left the industry and joined the police. Decades later, he would return to Doctor Who, becoming a regular writer for Big Finish Productions. In addition to Doctor Who, Smith's other audio dramas would include Survivors, based on the 1970s BBC television series; Star Cops, based on the cult 1987 TV series created by Chris Boucher, and their Originals boxset, Transference, starring Alex Kingston.

== Credits ==
=== Television ===
- Full Circle

=== Big Finish ===
==== Doctor Who main range ====
- The Brood of Erys
- Mistfall
- The Star Men
- Hour of the Cybermen
- Emissary of the Daleks

==== Lost Stories ====
- The First Sontarans

==== Fourth Doctor Adventures ====
- The Movellan Grave
- The Sons of Kaldor
- The Sinestran Kill
- The Quest of the Engineer

==== Classic Doctors, New Monsters ====
- The Sontaran Ordeal

==== The War Doctor ====
- The Eternity Cage
- The Lady of Obsidian

==== The First Doctor Adventures ====
- The Barbarians and the Samurai
- Return to Skaro

==== Early Adventures ====
- Domain of the Voord

==== Third Doctor Adventures ====
- Storm of the Horofax

==== Destiny of the Doctor ====
- Vengeance of the Stones

==== Companion Chronicles ====
- The Invasion of E-Space

==== Short Trips ====
- Flashpoint

==== UNIT: The New Series ====
- Earthfall (Extinction)
- Bridgehead (Extinction)
- Death in Geneva (Shutdown)
- The Battle of the Tower (Shutdown)
- The Sontaran Project (Encounters)

==== The Robots ====
- Toos and Poul

==== Survivors ====
- Judges
- Rescue
- The Second Coming
- Come the Horsemen
- Lockup
- Conflict

==== Blake's 7 ====
- Battleground
- The Liberator Chronicles Vol.10: Retribution
- The Liberator Chronicles Vol.11: Escape From Destiny

==== Star Cops ====
- One of Our Cops is Missing
- Hostage
- The New World

==== Big Finish Originals ====
- Transference

==== Timeslip ====
- Volume 1: The Age of the Death Lottery

==== Space 1999 ====
- Goldilocks
