= Meglos =

110 – Meglos
- Doctor Who serial

Cast
- Doctor: Tom Baker – Fourth Doctor
- Companions: Lalla Ward – Romana; John Leeson – Voice of K9
- Others: Jacqueline Hill – Lexa; Bill Fraser – General Grugger; Frederick Treves – Lieutenant Brotadac; Crawford Logan – Deedrix (Note: Also provided the voice of Meglos, uncredited.); Edward Underdown – Zastor; Colette Gleeson – Caris; Christopher Owen – Earthling (Note: Also briefly portrayed Meglos, uncredited.); Simon Shaw – Tigellan Guard

Production
- Directed by: Terence Dudley
- Written by: John Flanagan and Andrew McCulloch
- Script editor: Christopher H. Bidmead
- Produced by: John Nathan-Turner
- Executive producer: Barry Letts
- Music by: Paddy Kingsland (1); Peter Howell (2–4)
- Production code: 5Q
- Series: Season 18
- Running time: 4 episodes, 25 minutes each
- First broadcast: 27 September 1980
- Last broadcast: 18 October 1980

Chronology
← Preceded by The Leisure Hive	Followed by → Full Circle

Meglos is the second serial of the 18th season of the science fiction television series Doctor Who, which was first broadcast in four weekly parts on BBC1 from 27 September to 18 October 1980.

In the serial, the Zolfa-Thuran plant Meglos steals a huge source of power on the planet Tigella known as the Dodecahedron.

== Plot ==
The Prion star system contains two habitable planets: Zolfa-Thura, a desert world devoid seemingly of life; and Tigella, a jungle world inhabited by the humanoid Tigellans. Tigellan society is based on two castes: the scientific Savants, led by Deedrix, and the religious Deons, led by Lexa. The latter worship the Dodecahedron, a crystal they see as a gift from the god Ti. The Savants have utilised its power as an energy source for their civilisation. The planet’s leader, Zastor, mediates between the two factions, whose tensions have grown as the energy source has begun to fluctuate. Zastor invites his old friend, the Doctor, to Tigella to help. When the Fourth Doctor, Romana, and K9 try to land the TARDIS, they are trapped in a time loop, causing them to repeat a small pocket of time.

The culprit is Meglos, the last Zolfa-Thuran, a cactus creature who has remained hidden below the planet's surface in a secret structure. He has summoned a band of space pirates called Gaztaks to help him steal the Dodecahedron back from Tigella, as it is a powerful Zolfa-Thuran energy source. Meglos takes over the body of an Earthling and changes to the form of the Doctor to infiltrate the Tigellan city.

The Doctor and Romana break out of the time loop, and land on Tigella in the middle of the hostile jungle. As the Doctor heads off to find Zastor, Romana stumbles across dangerous vegetation and then the Gaztaks, waiting for Meglos by their spaceship. She gives them the slip and heads off to the city.

Meglos, as the Doctor, steals the Dodecahedron. However, the Earthling he's occupying fights back, causing green cactus spikes to break out on his skin. The Tigellans discover that the Dodecahedron is missing and sound the alarm. Meglos hides, but the real Doctor arrives and is accused of theft. Lexa uses the situation to stage a coup and have Zastor and Deedrix are arrested and the Doctor prepared for sacrifice to Ti.

Trapped inside the city, Meglos takes a hostage Savant named Caris. She gets the upper hand when the Earthling tries another bout of resistance. In a subsequent mix-up, Romana overpowers Caris, letting Meglos escape, reunite with the Gaztaks, and go back to Zolfa-Thura.

The real Doctor proves that he did not steal the artifact and that there is a doppelgänger at work. The Doctor, Romana, Caris, and Deedrix head with K9 for the TARDIS, determined to follow the Gaztaks. The ship touches down on Zolfa-Thura and Meglos tells the Gaztaks that his race perished in a civil war over the control of the crystal, which can power a weapon strong enough to destroy planets. They place the Dodecahedron and aim the weapon at Tigella.

When the Doctor arrives, he impersonates Meglos and confuses the Gaztaks. He redirects the super-weapon at Zolfa-Thura before both he and Meglos are detained. Meglos abandons the Earthling but is unable to stop the Doctor fleeing back to the TARDIS nor persuade the Gaztaks not to fire the weapon. From the TARDIS the Doctor and his friends witness the destruction of Zolfa-Thura, along with the Gaztaks, Meglos, and the Dodecahedron. The Doctor and Romana depart and prepare to take the Earthling home, but as they are leaving Romana receives a message from the Time Lords that she must return to Gallifrey.

== Production ==
Episode	Title	Run time	Original release date	UK viewers (millions)
1	"Part One"	24:43	27 September 1980	5.0
2	"Part Two"	21:24	4 October 1980	4.2
3	"Part Three"	21:19	11 October 1980	4.7
4	"Part Four"	19:30	18 October 1980	4.7

Working titles for this story included The Golden Pentangle and The Last Zolfa-Thuran. This is one of only two multi-part stories to feature all credited cast members in every episode, the other being The Edge of Destruction (1964).

This story features the only use in Doctor Who of a camera-linking system known as Scene-Sync that allowed the use of non-static shots of characters superimposed onto a miniature set. As the cameras on the actors were moved, the cameras on the miniature set moved the equivalent scaled amount automatically. The exact scale motion was achieved by trial and error, involving minute adjustments to the voltage delivered to the slave camera's motors. Part Four's closing theme was transposed to the lower key of the original theme music.

During production of this story, Madame Tussauds in London debuted the "Doctor Who Exhibition". Included were sculptures of both the Fourth Doctor and his Meglos doppelganger. As a result, Tom Baker is the only person to have appeared twice in the wax museum.

When writing the 2010 story The Lodger, Gareth Roberts had thought of making it a sequel to Meglos but this sequel idea was ultimately dropped.

=== Cast notes ===
Jacqueline Hill, who played the First Doctor's companion Barbara Wright, makes a guest appearance as Lexa, marking the first time a companion has returned to play a role other than their original character. Brotadac is an anagram of "Bad Actor", an in-joke by the production team, who were then somewhat embarrassed when the part went to Frederick Treves, whom they considered a fine actor. Bill Fraser only agreed to take the role of Grugger on condition the character was allowed to kick K9. His request was granted; he later appeared in the spin-off pilot K-9 and Company. Crawford Logan also provided the voice of Meglos but was credited only as Deedrix.

== Commercial releases ==
=== In print ===
Meglos
- Author: Terrance Dicks
- Cover artist: Andrew Skilleter
- Series: Doctor Who book: Target novelisations
- Release number: 75
- Publisher: Target Books
- Publication date: 5 May 1983
- ISBN: 0-426-20136-1

Terrance Dicks' novelisation was published by Target Books in February 1983. Dicks names Meglos' unfortunate human host and bookends the novel with his kidnapping and subsequent return to Earth. A French translation was published in 1987. An audiobook of the Target novelisation was released by BBC Audio on 1 July 2021 read by Jon Culshaw and John Leeson.

=== Home media ===
Meglos was released on VHS in April 2003, on DVD in January 2011, and as part of the Doctor Who DVD Files (issue 109) in March 2013. Paddy Kingsland and Peter Howell's incidental music for the serial was released as part of the compilation album Doctor Who at the BBC Radiophonic Workshop Volume 4: Meglos & Full Circle in 2002.
