= Warriors' Gate =

113 – Warriors' Gate
- Doctor Who serial

Cast
- Doctor: Tom Baker – Fourth Doctor
- Companions: Lalla Ward – Romana; Matthew Waterhouse – Adric; John Leeson – Voice of K9
- Others: Clifford Rose – Rorvik; Kenneth Cope – Packard; David Kincaid – Lane; Harry Waters – Royce; Vincent Pickering – Sagan; Freddie Earlle – Aldo; David Weston – Biroc; Jeremy Gittins – Lazlo; Robert Vowles – Gundan

Production
- Directed by: Paul Joyce; Graeme Harper (uncredited)
- Written by: Stephen Gallagher
- Script editor: Christopher H. Bidmead
- Produced by: John Nathan-Turner
- Executive producer: Barry Letts
- Music by: Peter Howell
- Production code: 5S
- Series: Season 18
- Running time: 4 episodes, 25 minutes each
- First broadcast: 3 January 1981
- Last broadcast: 24 January 1981

Chronology
← Preceded by State of Decay	Followed by → The Keeper of Traken

Warriors' Gate is the fifth serial of the 18th season of the British science fiction television series Doctor Who. It was written by Stephen Gallagher and was first broadcast in four weekly parts on BBC1 from 3 to 24 January 1981.

The serial is set at an intersection between the universe of E-Space and the home universe of the alien time traveller the Fourth Doctor (Tom Baker). In the serial, the Doctor and his travelling companion Romana (Lalla Ward) seek to free the time-sensitive Tharils from a group of slavers led by Captain Rorvik (Clifford Rose).

Warriors' Gate is the last of three loosely connected serials set in E-Space. It is the last serial to feature Ward as Romana and the last regular appearance of John Leeson as the voice of K9.

== Plot ==
Inside the TARDIS, the Fourth Doctor, Romana, Adric, and K9, while travelling between E-Space and the normal universe (N-Space), become trapped in a white null space between the universes. Elsewhere in the void, a slave vessel, run by Captain Rorvik, has also become trapped. It uses members of the leonine Tharil race as their navigators. On becoming stuck, the current navigator, Biroc, escapes the ship and makes his way to the TARDIS on the winds of time. Biroc warns the TARDIS crew of Rorvik's treachery before disappearing. K9's memory wafers are shredded by the winds of time, leaving him functional but lacking long-term memories. The Doctor leaves on his own to explore the null space. He encounters some robots, called Gundans.

Meanwhile, Rorvik and his crew have discovered the TARDIS. Romana leaves to talk to them. Rorvik, believing Romana to be time-sensitive like the Tharils, dupes her into returning to their ship to examine the engines. When Romana does not return, Adric and K9 leave to recover her, but get separated; Adric eventually makes it to the ship and hides aboard, while K9 reunites with the Doctor and aids in repairing the Gundan, after which he learns from it that they were built by slaves and used to overthrow their masters in a violent battle. The Doctor's work is disrupted when Rorvik and several of his men arrive. During a stand-off between the crew and the Doctor, another Gundan activates and walks through the seemingly-solid mirror. Rorvik demands an explanation from the Doctor, revealing he has Romana captive, but the Doctor's only response is to walk through the mirror himself.

Aboard the slaver ship, Romana is freed by another Tharil named Lazlo, and she hides in the hull. She encounters Adric; the two work out that the ship is made from an incredibly dense dwarf star alloy that can contain the Tharils. K9 arrives, and informs the two of dimensional instability in the null space, which they attribute to the alloy, causing the space to collapse in on itself. Romana rejoins Lazlo, who takes her to the gateway and through the mirror, while Adric remains aboard the ship.

On the other side of the mirror, the Doctor and Romana are reunited with Biroc in a stable, time-locked universe. A repentant Biroc explains they were the slave masters, travelling on the winds of time in order to ravage other planets and subjugate their populations as slaves until the Gundan revolt. The Doctor and Romana are returned to the null space, and are immediately captured by Rorvik. Rorvik's crew realise that the null space is shrinking as the distances between the gateway, the TARDIS, and slaver ship continue to decrease. Rorvik has ordered the crew to try to blast through the mirrors in gateway, believing it to be the way out, but the mirrors resist all attacks. With the gateway and ship in visible distance of each other, Rorvik resorts to one last attempt to break the mirrors by using the exhaust of the ship's engines against them. While the Doctor warns that this action will be as doomed as the previous ones, Romana regroups with Lazlo and Adric, and together they free the remaining Tharils on the slaver ship. The TARDIS crew flee to the TARDIS as Rorvik initiates his plan—the blast from the engines is reflected by the mirrors back onto the ship, destroying it and its crew.

As the saved Tharils pass through the mirror, Romana announces that she will be staying with them, having become empathetic to their plight and not wanting to return to Gallifrey. The Doctor gives her K9, as passing through the mirror will restore his memory but he will be unable to return. The Tharils, in exchange, provide the Doctor with information on how to leave the void back to N-Space.

== Production ==
=== Conception ===
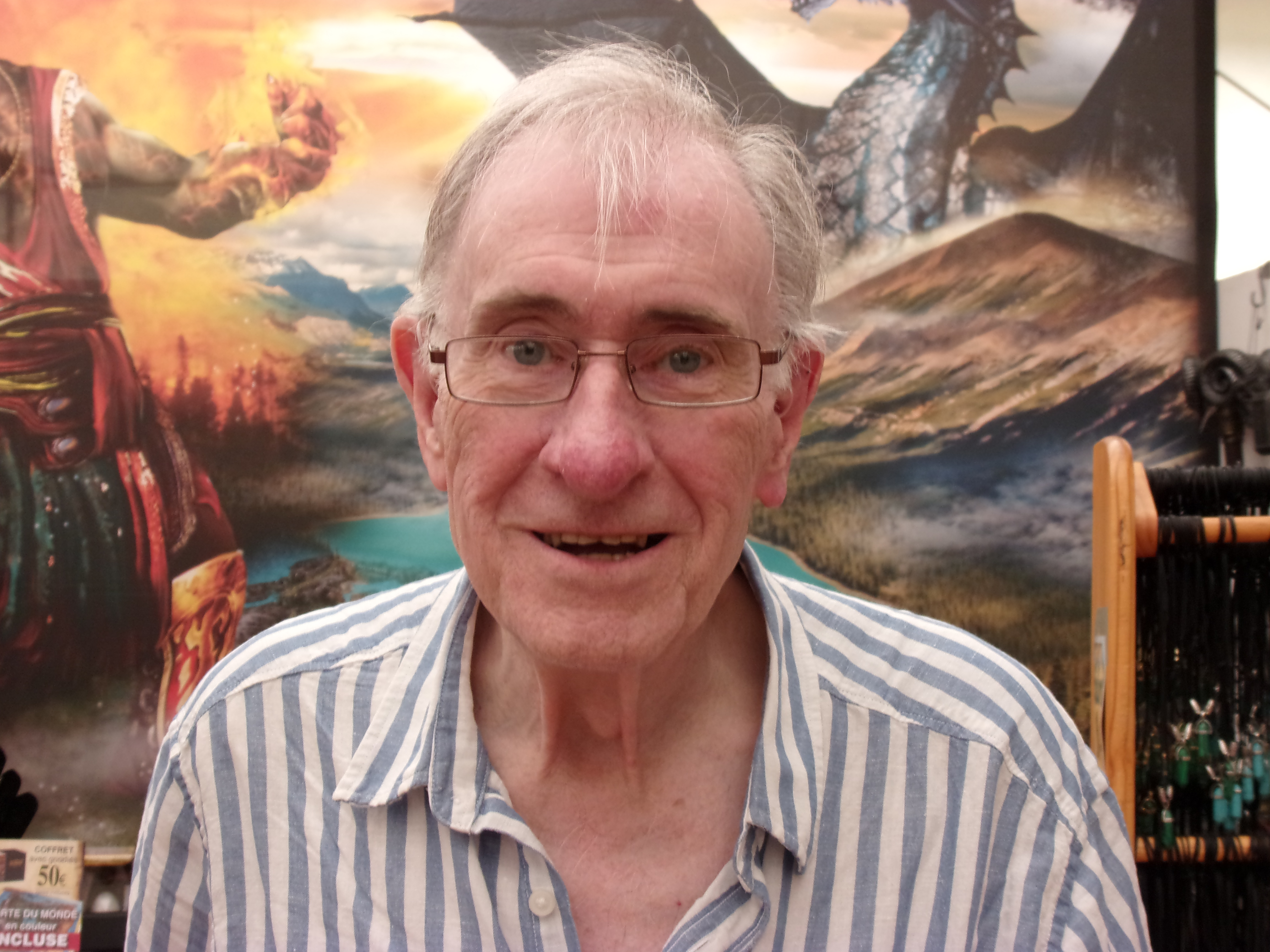
Science-fiction novelist Christopher Priest's (pictured) story Sealed Orders was initially commissioned as the season's fifth serial, but was eventually replaced with Stephen Gallagher's The Dream Time.

In 1979, Douglas Adams, at the time Doctor Who's script editor, met with science-fiction novelist Christopher Priest to develop a four part serial that Adams hoped would add more hard science fiction to the show. In December of that year, Adams left the show, leaving Priest's serial abandoned. Adams was replaced by Christopher H. Bidmead, who aimed to reorient the series around serious science fiction concepts. Bidmead approached several new writers for the series, eventually recontacting Priest after reading one of his novels and taking interest in his high concept approach. In February 1980, Bidmead commissioned a scene breakdown of the idea Priest had developed with Adams, now titled Sealed Orders. The next month, he commissioned Priest to produce four scripts for Sealed Orders, which was to run as the fifth story in the upcoming eighteenth season and conclude a trilogy of stories set in the universe of E-Space. The story would be a political thriller set on Gallifrey and featuring a duplicate Doctor and several TARDISes. Although Bidmead closely supervised Priest, who had never written for television before, the scripts Priest produced were judged unusable, resembling a novel more than a workable television script. Priest took issue with Bidmead's proposed changes and rewrites, and eventually withdrew from the series in April 1980.

As a back-up in case Sealed Orders fell through, Bidmead had also commissioned a script from writer Stephen Gallagher. Although, like Priest, Gallagher had never written for television, he was well-experienced in writing for radio. Gallagher had written a successful play for Piccadilly Radio titled The Last Rose of Summer, set in a dystopian Britain and broadcast in 1978. The following year, Gallagher produced a sequel, Hunter's Moon, and in 1980 completed the trilogy with The Babylon Run. Early in his tenure on Doctor Who, Bidmead had read Gallagher's 1979 BBC Radio 4 play An Alternative to Suicide, submitted as a writing sample by the play's director. Impressed by the play, Bidmead contacted Gallagher and met with him in December 1979 to discuss ideas for a serial. Although Gallagher was familiar with Doctor Who, he had not seen the show since it featured companion Sarah Jane Smith, who had been written out in 1976.

Among the ideas Gallagher presented was a one-page outline for a story called The Dream Time, originally intended as the final play in his The Last Rose of Summer Trilogy before Gallagher replaced it with The Babylon Run. The Dream Time centres on the character Mitchell fleeing to a wasteland planet once inhabited by an advanced civilisation, culminating in a chase through gateways into parallel worlds. The story was inspired by the Aboriginal Australian concept of the Dreaming, which an Australian colleague had introduced to Gallagher. The concept had been in vogue in 1970s pop culture as a parallel reality through which communication across time and space was possible. Gallagher pitched a five-page outline of the story to Bidmead. As he was unsure when the serial would be produced, he did not include the Doctor's current companions, K9 and Romana, in the outline, referring instead to a generic companion figure.

=== Writing ===
==== Development ====
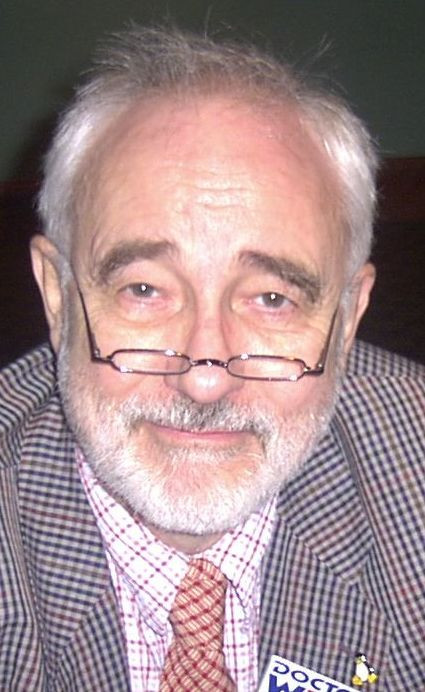
Script editor Christopher H. Bidmead worked closely with Stephen Gallagher to develop many of the serial's ideas, including its use of the I Ching.

Gallagher's story was heavily influenced by the Jean Cocteau films La Belle et la Bête and Orphée, as well as two novels he was reading: The Forever War by Joe Haldeman and The Demolished Man by Alfred Bester. With Bidmead, Gallagher developed the idea of a marooned spaceship in a white void and an old banqueting hall where multiple dimensions meet. The story would see the Doctor and his companion follow the time-sensitive navigator of the spaceship to the banqueting hall. The Doctor would eventually escape the spaceship crew, now trying to make him their navigator, by falling through a "mirror like door" into a maze-like house. The serial would end with the crew attempting to blast through the mirror door, eventually destroying their spaceship. Bidmead and Gallagher incorporated the concept of the I Ching, which Bidmead had been reading about, into the story as a means of navigation for the Doctor.

Gallagher met with Bidmead on 30 January 1980 and was briefed on the concept of E-Space, a universe that the TARDIS would be trapped in throughout several of the season's serials. Bidmead suggested the story could end the E-Space arc by having the TARDIS escape through the interdimensional gateway. He also directed Gallagher to include K9 being permanently damaged, with only the Gateway able to save him. The two decided on the names of several characters. The time-sensitive navigator and another escaped member of his species would be named Biroc and Laszlo respectively, after cinematographers Joseph Biroc and Ernest Laszlo. Two old cleaners aboard the ship, inspired by two cleaning women Gallagher knew from Granada Television, were named Aldo and Waldo. The ship's captain was named Rorvik, after science journalist and novelist David Rorvik, while another crewman, Sagan, was named for Carl Sagan. After meeting with Bidmead, Gallagher put together an episode breakdown. He rewrote the cliffhanger to the first episode from the Doctor being menaced by one of the time-sensitive creatures to him being attacked by a suit of armor in the Gateway, which he suggested to Bidmead in early February.

On 15 March, Bidmead wrote Gallagher about new developments in the season that The Dream Time needed to include. As well as ending the E-Space trilogy, Gallagher was also given the task of writing out Romana and K9 and incorporating the new companion Adric. Producer John Nathan-Turner and Lalla Ward had agreed on Romana's departure early in the year, while K9 was phased out because of difficulties with using the prop and Nathan-Turner's feeling that the robot dog had become a "get out clause" for writers. Gallagher had to include Romana's summons to Gallifrey, mention of the Charged Vacuum Emboitment through which the TARDIS had entered E-Space, and that Romana was now mature enough to leave the Doctor. On 17 March, a scene breakdown was commissioned, which Gallagher delivered on 25 March.

==== Scripting ====
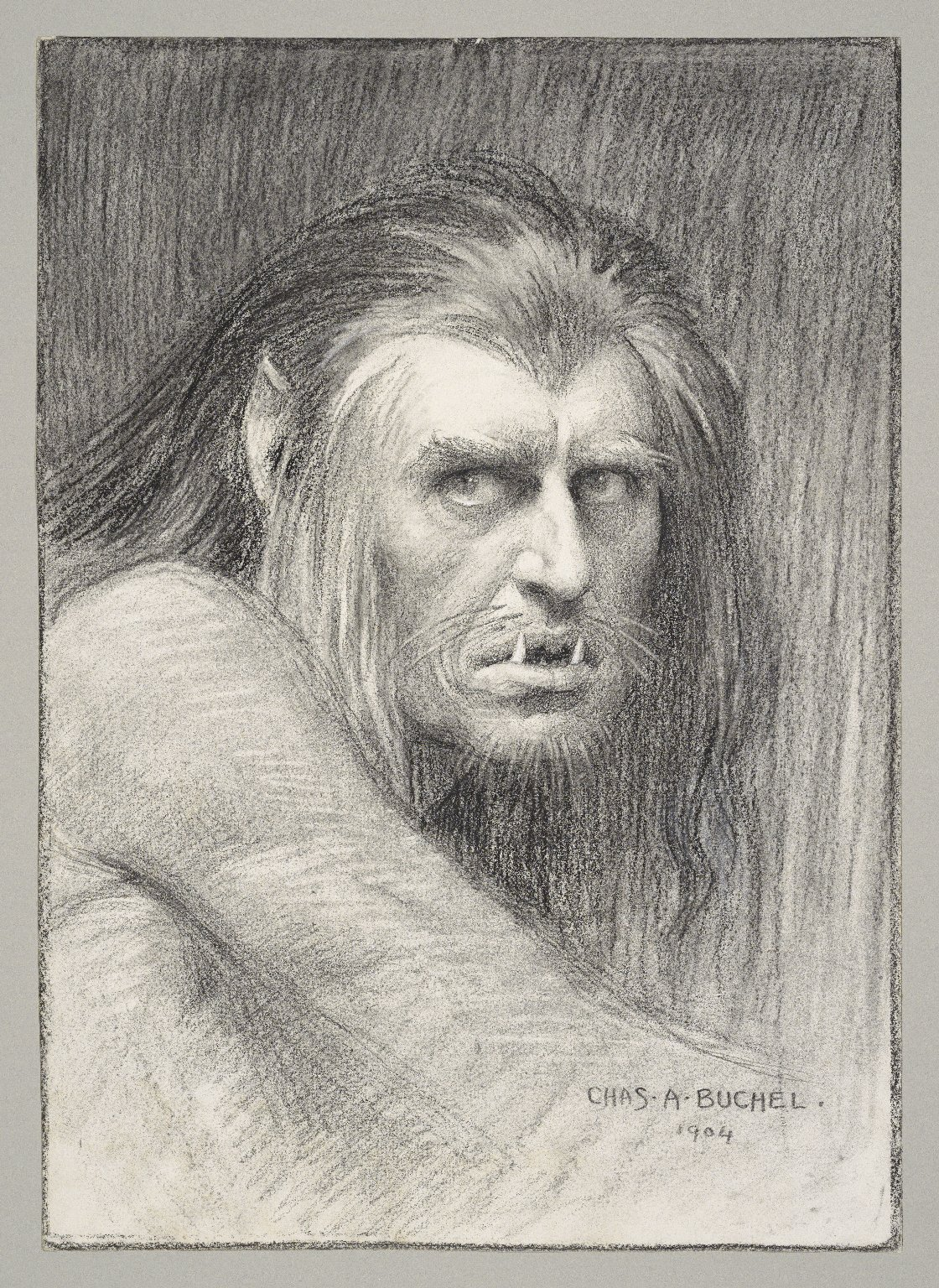
In early drafts, the time-sensitive Tharils were named the Caliban, after the shipwrecked, beast-like character (pictured) from William Shakespeare's The Tempest.

Once Sealed Orders was abandoned, Bidmead commissioned four episodes of The Dream Time on 14 April. Had Sealed Orders gone through, Bidmead planned to reuse several elements of Gallagher's outline in later stories. Gallagher felt uneasy at Priest's failure at producing a quality story, seeing him as an accomplished writer. The scripts were due 7 June, and were delivered by Gallagher on 11 June, after several more meetings throughout May. On 30 June, Bidmead and Nathan-Turner accepted the scripts but demanded rewrites. Unfamiliar with writing for television, Gallagher included detailed instructions for stage directions and camera angles in his first draft, later describing it as "a control freak's manifesto." The script was formatted unusually, using asterisks to mark scene changes and without standard number scenes. Several scenes were judged too ambitious to realize on television. Originally, the script was much more comedic, with Rorvik's crew being given a much humorous dialogue, two of the workers being played as a double-act. Executive producer Barry Letts was against the comedy in the script, arguing that it risked turning the show into pantomime and that the crewmen should be played seriously. Bidmead also wished to town down some of the fantastical elements of the script in favor of more hard science.

The director assigned to the serial was Paul Joyce, who had impressed Nathan-Turner with Keep Smiling, a play for the program Play for Today, and who was known for his documentaries on actors, filmmakers, and artists. Hoping to encourage the use of less established directors, Nathan-Turner had suggested in June that Joyce direct for the show. Joyce was given two options of serials to work on and chose The Dream Time because of its technical nature. On 25 July, Joyce sent four pages of script notes to Gallagher with several suggestions, including depicting the battle between what would become the time-sensitive beings and the robotic Gundans. Pressed for time and busy with work for Granada Television, Gallagher dictated notes for his third draft to Bidmead over the phone. Bidmead and Joyce used the notes to write a third draft.

Gallagher was told that the scenes he had written were "not dramatically strong enough," and Bidmead and Joyce spent every evening for a week working on rewriting the scripts. The two worked on Bidmead's Vector Graphic MZ System B computer, Bidmead writing while Joyce offered notes and read The Guardian. (Note: During these sessions Bidmead added the element of the MZ to the script, named for his computer.) Although Gallagher's material was mostly left intact, it was simplified for television. They removed two crew members named Dulles and Jos from the cast, which Joyce had suggested. The new drafts were edited into rehearsal scripts in early August, finishing on Monday 11 August. That Thursday, the BBC announced that the serial would begin airing 20 December. On 29 August, Barry Letts criticized the existing scripts for being unclear in several places and offered advice on the references to the I Ching. The same day, Bidmead arranged for Joyce to formally rewrite the serial for a fee. Joyce accepted but refused a credit so as to not offend Gallagher.

The name of the time sensitive beings was changed many times. Gallagher initially named them the Caliban, after the character from William Shakespeare's The Tempest. Later drafts changed the name to "Tharks," which was amended to "Thars" by Nathan-Turner, who felt the previous name was too reminiscent of B movies, and then to "Tharls" by Bidmead. When fan Ian Levine pointed out that the name was too similar to that of the Thals from the serial The Daleks, Bidmead suggested the name "Tharils." Gallagher submitted a second draft of the scripts in July. The robot suits of armor were initially called Shoguns before being renamed Gundans. Bidmead was not pleased with the title The Dream Time and suggested titling the serial Gateway. Gallagher renamed it to Warriors' Gate because of his concern that Gateway was already the name of a 1977 novel by Frederik Pohl.

=== Casting and design ===
Several actors were considered for the part of Rorvik, among them John Normington, Frank Windsor, Stratford Johns, and Derek Jacobi. Clifford Rose wrote to Nathan-Turner on 22 July to ask for the part of a "nasty" and was subsequently cast. Rose's approach to the character took inspiration from Captain Mainwaring of the sitcom Dad's Army. Kenneth Cope was cast as the crew member Packard, while Freddie Earlle, Bidmead's father-in-law, was cast as Aldo. Vincent Pickering, a mime, was cast as Sagan after he performed as a lion for Joyce. Joyce cast David Kincaid as crew member Lane after seeing him in the BBC production of A Midsummer Night's Dream. David Weston, who had previously appeared on the show in the serial The Massacre, was cast as Biroc after Joyce remembered seeing him in The Masque of the Red Death. Weston had previously worked with star Tom Baker in a 1966 production of The Winter's Tale. The serial was the last to star Lalla Ward as companion Romana; Ward challenged Bidmead and Nathan-Turner's decision to play the character's exit unemotionally, and Bidmead responded by insisting that the show was not a soap opera.

Graeme Story, who had worked on The Horns of Nimon, was brought on as set designer. Pauline Cox, who had worked on Image of the Fendahl, was chosen as make-up designer, while June Hudson, who had worked on the series since The Ribos Operation, was selected as costume designer. Matt Irvine was chosen to supervise visual effects. Hudson initially designed a Regency-inspired costume for Romana, but at Nathan-Turner's request replaced it with one similar to the red top she wore herself. For the Tharils, Hudson designed an outfit inspired by buccaneers as well as Cocteau's Beauty and the Beast, including a latex nose and fur. Joyce told the production design team to take inspiration from 2001: A Space Odyssey for the serial. Roger Oldhamstead designed the Gundan costumes, using a silver vacuum skull mask over a black leotard and balaclava. Story repurposed parts of the Vogon spaceship from The Hitchhiker's Guide to the Galaxy for the privateer.

=== Filming ===
Ahead of production, director Paul Joyce took photographs of Powis Castle in Wales to be used as black and white backdrops in the serial.

Although Joyce was expected to plan ten days of rehearsals and shoot afterwards, fellow director Graeme Harper worried that Joyce would try to run the production his own way, advising Joyce that on Doctor Who he did not have access to the lengthier productions he was used to. Joyce did not write the camera scripts himself, instead describing his desired shots to Harper, who then produced the scripts by working late hours with assistant floor manager Val McCrimmon. Because of the serial's complexity, Joyce opted for six rather than five studio filming days. He ordered prints of several films to demonstrate his visual approach to the crew, including Orphée, its sequel Testament of Orpheus, the Robert Aldrich noir Kiss Me Deadly, and the science-fiction film Dark Star by John Carpenter.

On 1 September 1980, Joyce and his girlfriend travelled to Powis Castle in Wales to take photographs, which were to be used as backdrops in Part Three as a cheaper alternative to location filming. Rehearsals had been due to begin on 25 August, but were delayed to 10 September by rewrites and changes in the studio dates. Tom Baker, who was recovering from an illness, made several efforts during rehearsals to cut down his lines, which Joyce rejected. Filming had been scheduled to begin on 17 September but was pushed back to 24 September by a carpenters' demarcation dispute, which put pressure on Joyce to overlap the two shooting blocks. The first block of shooting, in Studio 3 at the BBC Television Center, began with the opening montage of the spaceship's interior. Joyce, eager to achieve a cinematic look, recorded many sequences twice with both pedestal cameras and a handheld Ikegami camera. The next day saw the recording of scenes on the privateer's bridge, which had been built on a larger scale than planned. To depict the time rift, Joyce distorted the image live using Quantel video effects.

Tension quickly developed during production when, while filming the privateer scene, Joyce began shooting off set towards the studio's gallery lights, prompting lighting director John Dixon to stop the take. Dixon, whom Joyce had almost fired earlier in the day, argued for two hours that shoot off set was not permissible. The following day, Dixon's crew discovered several loose bolts in the set, which delayed filming again. Early on, Nathan-Turner considered replacing Joyce due to the delays, but decided against it. The final fight between the Doctor and Rorvik also overran by 45 minutes. Joyce had told the crew about the overrun before the actors, upsetting Baker. Filming on 26 September was also delayed by unfinished shots from the previous day and more concerns about the integrity of the set, leading to many scenes aboard the TARDIS being abandoned. The delays caused Joyce to abandon his shooting schedule. The delays in the first production block led to rushed rehearsals for the second block and prompted complaints against Joyce. On 29 September, Dixon complained that Joyce was self-indulgent and inept, while technical director John Dean cited Joyce's attempt to execute a handheld panorama shot as evidence that he did not understand studio filming. Joyce was a slow director according to Harper, and Dixon noted that he regularly used methods more typical of film than television production, including multiple angles of coverage, which required more resources from the multi-camera studio setting. These methods left Joyce overworked; during the second filming block he began delegating scenes to be directed by Harper and Nathan-Turner.

The second round of rehearsals were pushed back five days and began on 27 September. The second block of shooting began on 2 October in Studio 1 at the Television Center, beginning with the completion of the unfinished TARDIS scenes and followed by those in the Tharil banqueting hall.

Warriors' Gate was significant in that it was the last story to feature companion Romana played by Lalla Ward as well as the last regular appearance of John Leeson as long-running companion K9. Ward had requested to leave earlier, having been offered a part in another series, but Nathan-Turner kept her to her contract. It was also during the making of this serial that Tom Baker let it be known that he would leave at the end of the series. Ward and Baker were in a relationship and had been for some time, but by now things were turning acrimonious between the two, with many production personnel believing that they were on the point of splitting-up. It was with much surprise when they learned that just a few weeks later they had married. Leeson, who left the series at the end of Season 16, returned for Season 18 on the understanding that K9 would be written out toward the end of the season.

== Themes and influences ==
Director Paul Joyce took inspiration from several of the films he screened for his crew, aiming, for instance, to emulate the film noir look of Kiss Me Deadly. The John Carpenter film Dark Star, which he also requested a print of for his crew, also contains the element of a run-down ship threatening unstable worlds. Joyce also admired the films of French New Wave director Alain Resnais, including Last Year at Marienbad, which is set in a castle. Joyce also used Jean Cocteau's 1959 film Testament of Orpheus as an example of the monochromatic look he wished to achieve.

== Reception ==
Episode	Title	Run time	Original release date	UK viewers (millions)
1	"Part One"	22:54	3 January 1981	7.1
2	"Part Two"	23:47	10 January 1981	6.7
3	"Part Three"	22:15	17 January 1981	8.3
4	"Part Four"	24:53	24 January 1981	7.8

Ratings for the series increased with Warriors' Gate compared to the previous four serials of the season, due to the fact that the rival ITV network were no longer scheduling Buck Rogers in the 25th Century against Doctor Who. Warriors' Gate actually achieved the highest ratings of the entire 18th season with an average of 7.5 million viewers.

Paul Cornell, Martin Day, and Keith Topping wrote of the serial in The Doctor Who Discontinuity Guide (2013), praising the direction and Romana's departure from the series. Mark Braxton of Radio Times awarded the serial four out of five stars, regarding it as "an elaborate experiment with striking results."

== Commercial releases ==
=== In print ===
Doctor Who and Warriors' Gate
- Author: Stephen Gallagher
- Cover artist: Andrew Skilleter
- Series: Doctor Who book: Target novelisations
- Release number: 71
- Publisher: Target Books
- Publication date: 15 April 1982
- ISBN: 0-426-20146-9

A novelisation of this serial, written by Stephen Gallagher under the pseudonym "John Lydecker", was published by Target Books in April 1982. It and Terminus (Gallagher's other novelisation of his own script under the John Lydecker byline) are the only two Target novels that consist of continuous prose with no chapters. The novelisation contains many elements abandoned during the story's production, including the slaver's opening pursuit and damage at the hands of an Antonine Killer craft.

The novelisation was reprinted under Gallagher's own name in July 2023 as Warriors' Gate and Beyond: this edition also includes two short stories by Gallagher; "The Kairos Ring" and "The Little Book of Fate".

=== Home media ===
Warriors' Gate was released on VHS as part of "The E-Space Trilogy" boxed set in November 1997. It was released on DVD in January 2009, again in a boxed set entitled "The E-Space Trilogy". This serial was also released as part of the Doctor Who DVD Files (issue 87) in May 2012, and The Collection - Season 18 Blu-ray boxed set in March 2019.

== Works cited ==
- Collins, Frank (2019). Warriors' Gate. Obverse Books. ISBN 978-1-909031-86-9.
- Darlington, David (2004). "Warriors' Gate". Doctor Who Magazine Special Edition. No. 9. pp. 64–65.
- Pixley, Andrew (2019). "Mirror Images". Doctor Who Magazine. No. 536. pp. 44–48.
- Miles, Lawrence; Wood, Tat (2004). About Time 5: The Unauthorized Guide to Doctor Who (Seasons 18 to 21). Mad Norwegian Press. ISBN 0-9759446-4-9.
- Morris, Jonathan (2016). "The Fact of Fiction: Warriors' Gate". Doctor Who Magazine. No. 499. pp. 56–66.
- Muir, John Kenneth (1999). A Critical History of Doctor Who on Television. McFarland & Company. ISBN 978-0-7864-3716-0.
- Scoones, Paul (1994). "Riders on the Time Winds: Understanding Warriors' Gate". TSV. No. 37. The New Zealand Doctor Who Fan Club. pp. 35–39.
- Wright, Mark, ed. (2017). State of Decay, Warriors' Gate, The Keeper of Traken, Logopolis. Doctor Who: The Complete History. Vol. 33. London: Panini Comics, Hachette Partworks. ISSN 2057-6048.
