= The Armageddon Factor =

103 – The Armageddon Factor
- Doctor Who serial

Cast
- Doctor: Tom Baker – Fourth Doctor
- Companions: Mary Tamm – Romana; John Leeson (Voice of K9)
- Others: John Woodvine – The Marshal; Lalla Ward – Princess Astra; Davyd Harries – Shapp; Ian Saynor – Merak; William Squire – The Shadow; Barry Jackson – Drax; Valentine Dyall – The Black Guardian; Ian Liston – 'Hero'; Susan Skipper – 'Heroine'; John Cannon, Harry Fielder – Guards; Iain Armstrong – Technician; Pat Gorman – Pilot

Production
- Directed by: Michael Hayes
- Written by: Bob Baker; Dave Martin
- Script editor: Anthony Read; Douglas Adams (uncredited)
- Produced by: Graham Williams; David Maloney (uncredited)
- Executive producer: None
- Music by: Dudley Simpson
- Production code: 5F
- Series: Season 16
- Running time: 6 episodes, 25 minutes each
- First broadcast: 20 January – 24 February 1979

Chronology
← Preceded by The Power of Kroll	Followed by → Destiny of the Daleks

The Armageddon Factor is the sixth and final serial of the 16th season of the British science fiction television series Doctor Who, which was first broadcast in six weekly parts on BBC1 from 20 January to 24 February 1979. It was the last to feature Mary Tamm as Romana.

The serial is set on the planets Atrios and Zeos, and another planet in between them. In the serial, a nuclear war between Atrios and Zeos is nearing its end, but with Atrios losing. At the same time, the Shadow (William Squire), a henchman of the Black Guardian (Valentine Dyall), steals the time and space vessel the TARDIS, which contains the first five segments of the powerful Key to Time, and kidnaps Princess Astra of Atrios (Lalla Ward), who is the sixth and final segment.

== Plot ==
The planet Atrios, ruled by Princess Astra, is losing a nuclear war with their neighbouring planet Zeos. Astra, on a tour to rally the injured troops within their safety bunker, is beguiled into seeking safety in a false shelter. Soon after, while searching for the Key to Time's final segment, the Fourth Doctor and Romana arrive, encountering Astra before she is suddenly abducted. After some initial false accusations from the leading bull-headed military Marshal, the Doctor agrees to help his increasingly weak efforts against Zeos. The Doctor and Romana discover that there is another factor in the war, when Romana notices a control device attached to the Marshal's neck, the Doctor deduces there is another planetary object between Atrios and Zeos, and a skull-shaped receiver is found behind a mirror that the Marshal seemingly uses to meditate with.

The Doctor is abducted during an attempt to transmaterialise/transmat (teleport) to Zeos, and meets with the true opponent, the "Shadow", ruling over a space station called the "Planet of Evil". However, as part of the Shadow's stratagem, he releases the Doctor, hoping he will misstep in his search for the Segment. The Doctor transmats to Zeos, genuinely this time, reuniting with Romana, an Atrion officer, and K9. They all find that Zeos is deserted, its inhabitants possibly already annihilated, save for the giant supercomputer Mentalis, which is controlling the outcome of the war. K9 is able to communicate with it, and Mentalis declares the war over.

However, the Marshal seeks victory through his opponent's annihilation, and launches a single flagship offence to the planet. Mentalis detects the launch, and, unable to defend itself after surrendering, begins a self-destruct sequence set to destroy both Zeos and Atrios. The Doctor attempts to stop it, but it damages its central control after its perimeter defence is triggered. With a lack of options, the Doctor fashions an artificial stopgap Segment, and orders the Key to Time to shroud the Marshal's ship and Mentalis' systems in a time loop. However, without the true Segment, it slowly deteriorates.

Meanwhile, K9 is abducted by the Shadow and fitted with another control device. The Doctor's group reunites with Astra, seemingly escaped but actually made a pawn of the Shadow as well. With Astra's help, the Doctor pilots the TARDIS back to the Planet of Evil. There, they are all separated. The Doctor encounters another Time Lord, Drax, whom he last met at the Gallifreyan Academy. Drax, who is under duress, was employed by The Shadow to build Mentalis, but he agrees to help the Doctor, and also frees K9. The Shadow reveals he is an agent of the Black Guardian, and demands the Key to Time, threatening to torture Romana. The Doctor leads a servant of the Shadow, known as a Mute, to his TARDIS and opens the door, but Drax misinterprets the Doctor's plan, and shrinks the Doctor and himself, using a dimensional stabiliser from Drax's own TARDIS.

The Mute returns to the Shadow with the Key, and Romana realises why the Shadow needs it: Astra herself is the final segment, and from the Key's power, she transforms in front of everyone. The Doctor and Drax smuggle themselves into the Shadow's lair inside of K9, who pretends to be under the Shadow's control. Drax again uses the stabiliser to normalise themselves. In the confusion, The Doctor snatches the partially assembled Key and the final segment, and escapes with Romana, Drax, and K9 into the TARDIS. They return to Zeos, and, with the false Key segment and the time loop both expired, narrowly deactivate Mentalis' self-destruct, but the Doctor also realises that the Marshal is still en route. He quickly erects a shield around Zeos with the TARDIS, to deflect the Marshal's missiles towards the Planet of Evil, destroying it and killing the Shadow.

The White Guardian appears on the TARDIS scanner screen to congratulate the Doctor on finding and assembling the Key to Time, and requests that it be sent to him. However, the Doctor, catching onto the Guardian's blatant disregard for Astra's sacrifice, realises that it is actually the Black Guardian in disguise, and orders the Key to re-disperse, restoring Astra to life. Enraged, the Black Guardian threatens to kill him. In an attempt to evade him, the Doctor fits a randomiser into the TARDIS guidance system, sending it to an unknown location in time and space, leaving the Doctor with no idea of where they are headed, and the Guardian being unable to follow.

== Production ==
The script for The Armageddon Factor was commissioned to the experienced writing team of Bob Baker and Dave Martin by the producer Graham Williams who wanted writers whom he could trust to write the season finale on time. The first draft of the script that became The Armageddon Factor was submitted to Williams on 19 December 1977. The mutually destructive nuclear war between Zeos and Atrios was based upon and was a criticism of the Cold War between the Soviet Union and the United States. The Cold War always had threat of escalating into a Third World War which would ensure MAD (Mutually Assured Destruction) as nuclear strikes would destroy both sides at the same time. The story takes an anti-Cold War stance as it is suggested that the nuclear war between the two planets Atrios and Zeos is a pointless struggle that has caused the deaths of millions for nothing, which implies that Cold War is a struggle that endangers all life on earth for no good reason. The original script made the pacifistic message more clear as the nuclear war between the two planets was caused by misunderstandings in turn caused by a disastrous shift in the orbits of both Zeos and Atrios while the Shadow was more taking advantage of an existing conflict instead of causing it in the final version. The villainous character of the crazed militarist, the Marshal of Atrios, with his endless calls for victory no matter what the cost in human life, was based upon Winston Churchill. The story seems to imply that the sort of leadership provided by Churchill in World War Two was inappropriate for the Cold War given the threat of MAD. The Armageddon Factor has a strong critique of militarism as the Doctor says upon seeing the computer Mentalis "that's the way these military minds work", which he labels "the Armageddon factor". The underground base on Atrios was based upon the underground Central Government War Headquarters in Corsham, Wiltshire that had been built in the late 1950s as the location for the British government to operate from if London was destroyed by a Soviet nuclear strike in the event of World War Three.

The original script called for both Zeos and Atrios to be populated with the villain known as the Shadow manipulating both sides while the character that became Princess Astra was the scientist Reina who been kidnapped by the Shadow years before. During the course of rewrites, the character of Renia was renamed Astra, was made a princess instead of a scientist, and was given a more prominent role in the plot as compared to the original version. Douglas Adams, the incoming script editor, suggested the idea of making Astra into the sixth segment of the Key to Time as a way to raise the stakes for the audience, saying that having the shadow of the Shadow being the sixth segment as written in the original version of the script was not engaging enough for the audience. To save money on the production, it was decided to eliminate the characters on Zeos which required fewer actors and make Zeos run by the computer Mentalis. In his 1960 book On Thermonuclear War, the American futurist Herman Kahn wrote of a hypothetical Doomsday Machine, which he described as a computer controlling a stockpile of hydrogen bombs powerful enough to destroy all life on Earth that would be set off at the first sign of any nuclear attack from another nation or if there was an attempt to disarm it. The Doomsday Machine that Kahn had described inspired the Doomsday Machine depicted in the popular 1964 film Dr. Strangelove. The success of Dr. Strangelove led to a number of films such as the 1970 film Colossus: The Forbin Project that featured computers threatening to plunge the world into a nuclear holocaust. The computer Mentalis seems to have been based upon Kahn's hypothetical Doomsday Machine.

The character of Drax was originally intended for the 1976 story The Hand of Fear and was envisioned as an eccentric scientist. The outgoing script editor Anthony Read rewrote the character of Drax to make him into a bumbling Cockney comic sidekick who was portrayed as the "lovable rogue" archetype commonly associated with British criminals. In British culture, there are broadly two archetypes associated with criminals, namely the "hard man" and the "lovable rogue". The original ending written by Baker and Martin called for the Doctor to break up the Key to Time, and Adams changed the ending with the confrontation with the Black Guardian to provide a more dramatic climax. Adams provided the title of The Armageddon Factor as a title appropriate for a story about nuclear war and MAD. Cyril Luckham who played the White Guardian in The Ribos Operation was expected to return for The Armageddon Factor to play the Black Guardian, but was unavailable, leading for Valentine Dyall to be cast instead. Dyall was cast as the Black Guardian because he was an actor associated with villainous roles in horror films and TV shows.

Production started in October 1978 and was in turmoil as Tom Baker fought with Williams over the direction that the show was going. Baker wanted veto power over the scripts, directors and casting for the other actors, demands that Williams rejected. Baker submitted his resignation during the production, but agreed to rescind his resignation after several meetings with BBC executives. Williams had wanted to fire Baker during the production of The Armageddon Factor, arguing that he played the Doctor for too long and he found him a difficult actor to work with. The BBC executives were able to negotiate a truce between Williams and Baker who both agreed to return for another season, but relations between the star and the producer remained tense. The model scenes featuring toy spaceships were shot on 27 October 1978 at the BBC Television Film Studios in Ealing. The scenes that featured the actors were shot between 5 November-5 December 1978 at the BBC Television Centre Studio 3 in White City. The romantic relationship between Lalla Ward and Baker that was to end with their marriage in 1980 began during the production of The Armageddon Factor.

Mary Tamm had become unhappy with playing Romana as she argued that her character did not do very much except being captured and decided to leave Dr. Who, and, according to one source, announced her decision shortly after completion of The Armageddon Factor despite Williams wanting Tamm to stay on for another season. In her own version of events, Tamm said she had already decided by the third or fourth story (The Stones of Blood/The Androids of Tara) that she would leave the programme, but Williams did not believe, even at the very end of the season, that she would really leave. In a 2007 interview, she stated that she was willing to shoot a regeneration sequence to allow a smooth transition between her tenure and that of her eventual successor (Lalla Ward), but was not invited to do so.

== Broadcast and reception ==
Episode	Title	Run time	Original release date	UK viewers (millions)
1	"Part One"	24:39	20 January 1979	7.5
2	"Part Two"	23:56	27 January 1979	8.8
3	"Part Three"	25:03	3 February 1979	7.8
4	"Part Four"	25:09	10 February 1979	8.6
5	"Part Five"	24:42	17 February 1979	8.6
6	"Part Six"	25:09	24 February 1979	9.6

Paul Cornell, Martin Day, and Keith Topping gave the serial an unfavourable review in The Discontinuity Guide (1995), describing it as "a dreary end-of-season Oh-my-God-the-money's-run-out 'spectacular'" without subtle acting. In The Television Companion (1998), David J. Howe and Stephen James Walker wrote that The Armageddon Factor was "entertaining enough in itself, with some good direction by Michael Hayes and generally fine production values, but ultimately fails to tie up all the loose ends and leaves the over-arching plot strangely unresolved". They praised the Shadow but felt that the other characters were one-dimensional, and called the ending a "cop-out". In 2011, Patrick Mulkern of Radio Times stated that the serial "hugely disappoints, yet it's not an unmitigated disaster". He criticised the characterisation and much of the plot, but praised the direction and the Shadow. On the other hand, DVD Talk's Justin Felix gave the serial four out of five stars, saying that it "packs more of a wallop than the previous two stories" and had everything typical of Doctor Who. Felix also called it Mary Tamm's best performance. The American critic Keith Booker wrote that The Armageddon Factor was notably confused in its message as the serial has a strong anti-militarist message with its portrayal of nuclear war that has killed everyone on Zeos and killed nearly everyone on Atrios while at the same time portraying the universe as caught up in a Manichean struggle between evil vs. good, which undercut the pacifistic message. Booker noted that there was a contradiction between the serial's anti-war message along with its depiction of villains such as the Shadow who proudly self-identify as evil and who need to be resisted at all costs to allow good to prevail. Booker further criticized the confusing ending, which suggests that the White Guardian who sent the Doctor on his quest to find the Key to Time in The Ribos Operation had been the Black Guardian in disguise all along and that the Doctor "negated" the whole point of his quest by promptly breaking up the Key to Time once he had assembled it.

== Commercial releases ==
=== In print ===
A novelisation of this serial, written by Terrance Dicks, was published by Target Books in June 1980. A new novelisation by James Goss will be included in The Key to Time collection 29 October 2026.

=== Home media ===
Along with the rest of season sixteen, it was released on DVD in North America as part of the Key to Time box set in 2002, only available in Region 1. A remastered limited edition Key to Time box set was released in Region 2 in the United Kingdom on 24 September 2007. It contains more extras than the previously released US set. This remastered set was released in Region 1 on March 3, 2009.

== Books and articles ==
- Booker, Keith (2004). Science Fiction Television. Santa Monica: ABC-CLIO. ISBN 9780313052132.
- Case, George (2014). Calling Dr. Strangelove The Anatomy and Influence of the Kubrick Masterpiece. Jefferson: McFarland, Incorporated, Publishers. ISBN 9781476618487.
- Jenks, Chris; Lorentzen, Justin (2004). "The Kray Fascination". In Chris Jenks (ed.). Urban Culture Critical Critical Concepts in Literary and Cultural Studies Volume 4. London: Routledge. pp. 3–24. ISBN 9780415304993.
