= The Ribos Operation =

098 – The Ribos Operation
- Doctor Who serial

Cast
- Doctor: Tom Baker – Fourth Doctor
- Companions: Mary Tamm – Romana; John Leeson (Voice of K9)
- Others: Cyril Luckham – White Guardian; Iain Cuthbertson – Garron; Nigel Plaskitt – Unstoffe; Paul Seed – Graff Vynda-K; Robert Keegan – Sholakh; Timothy Bateson – Binro; Ann Tirard – The Seeker; Prentis Hancock – Shrieve Captain; Oliver Maguire, John Hamill – Shrieves

Production
- Directed by: George Spenton-Foster
- Written by: Robert Holmes
- Script editor: Anthony Read
- Produced by: Graham Williams
- Executive producer: None
- Music by: Dudley Simpson
- Production code: 5A
- Series: Season 16
- Running time: 4 episodes, 25 minutes each
- First broadcast: 2 – 23 September 1978

Chronology
← Preceded by The Invasion of Time	Followed by → The Pirate Planet

The Ribos Operation is the first serial of the 16th season of the British science fiction television series Doctor Who, which was first broadcast in four weekly parts on BBC1 from 2 to 23 September 1978. This serial introduces Mary Tamm as the companion Romana.

The serial is set on the primitive and superstitious planet Ribos. In the serial, the exiled Emperor of Levithia, Graff Vynda-K (Paul Seed), seeks a piece of the rare element jethrik on the planet. At the same time, the Fourth Doctor (Tom Baker) and his travelling companion Romana (Mary Tamm) look for the first segment of the powerful Key to Time, disguised as the same jethrik piece.

== Plot ==
The White Guardian recruits the Fourth Doctor to collect the six hidden and disguised segments of the powerful Key to Time. He assigns him an assistant Time Lady named Romanadvoratrelundar, whom the Doctor calls Romana. He warns him that the Black Guardian also seeks these segments, but for an evil purpose. The White Guardian provides them with a wand-like device, which can locate the pieces and remove their disguise. When inserted into the TARDIS console, the locator first reveals a segment to be on Cyrrenhis Minima, but then moves to Ribos.

Ribos is an icy planet with late-medieval-type inhabitants who are unaware of alien cultures. A human from Earth named Garron tries to sell Ribos to an exiled tyrant called the Graff Vynda-K. The Graff is impressed by the planet's supposed quantity of jethrik, the rarest and most valued mineral in the galaxy. He believes the opportunity confirmed when he sees a piece of jethrik among the Ribos crown jewels. This is all part of a ruse orchestrated by Garron; the jethrik was planted by Garron's assistant Unstoffe, who also was playing a native who spins a yarn to the Graff about a nearby lost mine. The locator points the Doctor and Romana to the same jethrik, which must be the disguised segment of the Key to Time.

The Graff provides a large sum of money as a deposit for the planet that is to be kept safely in the room with the crown jewels, watched by Ribos guards by day and a beast by night. Later, Unstoffe distracts the beast, recovers their piece of jethrik, and takes the money from the safe. The Graff learns of Garron's deception when he discovers a covert listening device in his room. He imprisons Garron with his "accomplices", the Doctor and Romana, and starts the search for Unstoffe, who still has the money and the jethrik. Unstoffe hides with Binro, a homeless outcast who believes that Ribos is a planet orbiting a star, and that there are other stars in the universe, which Unstoffe confirms to be true. The Ribos guards summon a Seeker who locates Unstoffe's hideout. Using the listening device in the Graff's room, Garron warns Unstoffe about the Graff. Binro, thankful for Unstoffe's encouragement, leads him to the labyrinthine catacombs under the city.

The Graff and his men enter the catacombs without the guards, who fear the place, and the Seeker warns that if they enter, "All but one are doomed to die." K9 helps the Doctor, Romana, and Garron escape and go to the catacombs. The guards destroy the entrance causing the ceiling to collapse on the Graff's men. Having recovered the money and the jethrik, the Graff gives his last surviving guard an explosive to kill himself with. The guard, actually the Doctor in disguise, swaps the explosive for the jethrik. The Graff walks off into the maze before exploding.

After leaving the catacombs, the Doctor, Romana, and K9 dematerialise in the TARDIS. Garron and Unstoffe claim the Graff's deserted ship, full of years of plunder, while the Doctor and Romana transform the jethrik into the first piece of the Key to Time.

== Production ==
Working titles for this story include Operation and The Ribos File. The opening scene, with the White Guardian, was actually written by Anthony Read and Graham Williams, and not Robert Holmes. The society depicted in The Ribos Operation was closely based upon medieval Russia, and the name Ribos was an anagram of the common Russian first name Boris. Popular British stereotypes of Imperial Russia were of a backward, primitive nation whose people were mired in superstition and ignorance, precisely the same qualities that the characters not from Ribos attribute to Ribos and its people. The currency of Ribos, the opek, referred to both the Russian coin kopek and to the oil cartel OPEC, often in news headlines then.

Operation is a British slang term for a swindle. The title of The Ribos Operation means something like the Ribos scam or the Ribos swindle. The critic Christopher Bahn noted that Holmes had a fondness for conmen as characters as several of his Dr. Who stories feature likeably sleazy conmen as major characters, and that the characters of Garron and Unstoffe were much the sort of characters whom Holmes liked to create. Bahn noted that Holmes subverted traditional ideas of morality by presenting the mark (the victim of the scam), the Graff Vynda-K, as a thoroughly unlikeable and unsympathetic character while presenting the scammers Garron and Unstoffe as "loveable rogues" whom the audience was to sympathise with. In British culture, there are broadly two archetypes associated with criminals, namely the "hard man" and the "lovable rogue". Bahn wrote of the Graff Vynda-K that he was "a perfect mark for a con-job story—dour and humorless and eager to use violence where it’s probably not even necessary, it’s easy to feel like he deserves to be rooked". The character of Garron was intended to be Australian-hence the references to Australia such as the statement that he swindled investors by fraudulently selling the Sydney Opera House-but was changed to being English when Iain Cuthbertson won the part in an audition. The end of the Graff Vynda-K, wandering about the catacombs of Shur (the capital of Ribos), delusional and insane while ranting about his past glories and future dreams of conquest was based upon the end of the villainous protagonist of the 1972 West German film Aguirre, the Wrath of God.

The serial was filmed entirely in studio in April 1978. From this story until The Horns of Nimon (1979–80), Baker wears an extra-long scarf, which is the original scarf and the stunt scarf sewn together.

=== Cast notes ===
Elisabeth Sladen, who as Sarah Jane Smith was last seen in The Hand of Fear (1976), was approached to return to the series as a replacement for Leela (who had left in The Invasion of Time). When Sladen declined the offer, Romana was created.

Prentis Hancock had appeared in Spearhead from Space (1970), Planet of the Daleks (1973), and Planet of Evil (1975).

== Broadcast and reception ==
Episode	Title	Run time	Original release date	UK viewers (millions)
1	"Part One"	25:02	2 September 1978	8.3
2	"Part Two"	24:46	9 September 1978	8.1
3	"Part Three"	24:42	16 September 1978	7.9
4	"Part Four"	24:50	23 September 1978	8.2

Paul Cornell, Martin Day, and Keith Topping gave the serial a favourable review in The Discontinuity Guide (1995), calling it "a lovely story". In The Television Companion (1998), David J. Howe and Stephen James Walker praised the "cracking set of scripts" and production values. They described Binro as "perhaps the most fascinating and well written of all the characters in the main part of the story set on Ribos" and also praised Mary Tamm's debut as Romana, despite noting that "she goes through the whole of The Ribos Operation giving the impression that she has got an unpleasant smell under her nose". In 2010, Patrick Mulkern of Radio Times gave the story a positive review, in particular towards the acting and production, but stated that he did not like Binro. The A.V. Club reviewer Christopher Bahn called The Ribos Operation one of Robert Holmes' better stories, writing that it was "a fun, tightly constructed caper". DVD Talk's Justin Felix gave the story three and a half out of five stars, writing that it was an "effective beginning" to the season despite being a "simple" story. While he praised Romana's character, he felt that Tamm's performance was "a bit flat".

== Commercial releases ==
=== In print ===
Doctor Who and the Ribos Operation
- Author: Ian Marter
- Cover artist: John Geary
- Series: Doctor Who book: Target novelisations
- Release number: 52
- Publisher: Target Books
- Publication date: 11 December 1979
- ISBN: 0-426-20092-6

Ian Marter's novelisation was published by Target Books in December 1979. Curiously, it features the Doctor opening the TARDIS doors by means of an old brass knob. A new novelisation by James Goss will be included in The Key to Time collection 29 October 2026.

=== In audio ===
It was released on CD in March 2011. John Leeson, who provided the voice of K9 in the original 1978 TV serial, reads Ian Marter's complete and unabridged novelisation of this story.

=== Home media ===
It was released on VHS on 3 April 1995. Along with the rest of season sixteen, it was released in North America as part of the Key to Time box set, as well as being marketed separately. It was released in a restored limited edition on region 2 DVD on 24 September 2007. The DVD box set was reissued in November 2009. It was also released as part of the Doctor Who DVD Files in Issue 107 on 6 February 2013.

== Books and articles ==
- Jenks, Chris; Lorentzen, Justin (2004). "The Kray Fascination". In Chris Jenks (ed.). Urban Culture Critical Critical Concepts in Literary and Cultural Studies Volume 4. London: Routledge. pp. 3–24. ISBN 9780415304993.
