= Zanak (disambiguation) =

Zanak is an Indian surname.

Zanak may also refer to:

- Zanak, a pirate planet in The Pirate Planet of Doctor Who series
- Zanak, the forward of Team White Snow, see List of Immortal Grand Prix characters

== See also ==
- Lappeh Zanak, a village in India
