= The Pirate Planet =

099 – The Pirate Planet
- Doctor Who serial

Cast
- Doctor: Tom Baker – Fourth Doctor
- Companions: Mary Tamm – Romana; John Leeson (Voice of K9)
- Others: Bruce Purchase – The Pirate Captain; Andrew Robertson – Mr. Fibuli; Rosalind Lloyd – Nurse; David Warwick – Kimus; David Sibley – Pralix; Ralph Michael – Balaton; Primi Townsend – Mula; Clive Bennett – Citizen; Bernard Finch – Mentiad; Adam Kurakin – Guard

Production
- Directed by: Pennant Roberts
- Written by: Douglas Adams
- Script editor: Anthony Read
- Produced by: Graham Williams
- Executive producer: None
- Music by: Dudley Simpson
- Production code: 5B
- Series: Season 16
- Running time: 4 episodes, 25 minutes each
- First broadcast: 30 September 1978
- Last broadcast: 21 October 1978

Chronology
← Preceded by The Ribos Operation	Followed by → The Stones of Blood

The Pirate Planet is the second serial of the 16th season in the British science fiction television series Doctor Who, which was first broadcast in four weekly parts on BBC1 from 30 September to 21 October 1978. It forms the second serial of the Key to Time story arc. It was written by Douglas Adams and features some of his humour.

The tyrant Queen Xanxia (a dual role played by Vi Delmar and Rosalind Lloyd) and the Captain (Bruce Purchase) use the hollow planet Zanak as a spaceship that surrounds smaller planets, including Calufrax, the second segment of the powerful Key to Time in disguise, to plunder the planets' resources that help keep Xanxia alive.

== Plot ==
The Key to Time tracer points the Fourth Doctor and Romana to the cold and boring planet of Calufrax, but when they arrive they find an unusual civilisation living in perpetual prosperity. Although a strange band of people with mysterious powers known as the Mentiads are feared by the society, the Doctor discovers that they are good people but with an unknown purpose. He instead fears the Captain, the planet's leader and benefactor. After meeting the Captain on the bridge he learns that they are actually on a hollowed-out planet named Zanak, which has been materialising around other planets to plunder their resources.

After repairing Zanak's engines, which were damaged when the planet materialised in the same place as the TARDIS, the Captain plans to take Zanak to Earth. The Doctor finds the true menace controlling the Captain is the ancient tyrant Queen Xanxia, disguised as the Captain's nurse, who uses the resources mined from planets in an attempt to gain immortality. Her physical body sits between Time Dams, devices that hold back the ravages of time, as she is old and near death, and a younger version of her is projected via a solid 3D device. Despite the Captain's apparent insanity, he is a calculating person who plans to destroy Xanxia. The Mentiads learn that their psychic powers are strengthened by the destruction of entire worlds beneath their feet: As the people on the planets die, their combined psychic force boosts the Mentiad's power.

Throughout Zanak, the Key to Time locator has been giving odd signals that seem to indicate that the segment is everywhere. Once the Doctor and Romana see the Captain's trophy room of planets, they conclude that Calufrax itself is the segment that they are looking for. The Captain's intends to use the gravitational power of all the crushed worlds to essentially drill a hole through the time dams, bypass its fail-safe mechanism, and let time move forward so the queen dies. They use the TARDIS to once again disrupt Zanak's materialisation around Earth while the Mentiads sabotage the engines. Xanxia kills the Captain when he finally turns against her and his plan fails. As Calufrax is not a real world, its mass is different and Zanak is unable to consume it. The Doctor, Romana, and the Mentiads destroy the bridge and Xanxia, ending the devastation caused by Zanak's travels. The Doctor rigs the system to drop the crushed worlds into the centre of Zanak where they'll expand and fill it, except for Calufrax which he sends it off into the time/space continuum where they pick it up later.

== Production ==
The original draft for this story was extremely complex, centred on a Time Lord trapped in a giant aggression-absorbing machine and several paradoxes, it had to be heavily simplified by the script editor, Anthony Read.

According to the DVD commentary, the Doctor's accident with the console early in the story was staged to explain Baker's real-life cut lip, which was due to a dog bite. The scenes in the engine room were filmed at the Berkeley nuclear power station, which made many of the cast and crew rather nervous.

The 16mm location work for this story is still held in the BBC archive.

=== Cast notes ===
Vi Delmar, who played the old Queen Xanxia (uncredited), asked for extra payment to remove her false teeth in her scenes. David Warwick later played the police commissioner in "Army of Ghosts" (2006) and David Garnier in the audio play The Harvest.

== Broadcast and reception ==
Episode	Title	Run time	Original release date	UK viewers (millions)
1	"Part One"	25:05	30 September 1978	9.1
2	"Part Two"	25:30	7 October 1978	7.4
3	"Part Three"	25:47	14 October 1978	8.2
4	"Part Four"	25:16	21 October 1978	8.4

It was repeated on BBC1 on four consecutive Thursdays from 12 July – 2 August 1979, achieving viewing figures of 2.8, 4.0, 3.3 and 2.9 million respectively.

Paul Cornell, Martin Day, and Keith Topping wrote of the serial in The Discontinuity Guide (1995), "An inventive story, The Pirate Planet has matured into a satisfying mixture of the clever and the absurd." In The Television Companion (1998), David J. Howe and Stephen James Walker described it as "enjoyable", especially due to Baker and Tamm's performances as well as the Captain and Mr Fibuli. However, they wrote that the other supporting characters were "simply awful". In 2011, Mark Braxton of Radio Times noted a few plot holes and that the budget could not convey the scope of ideas, but he praised the performances and the story's playful tone. DVD Talk's Justin Felix gave The Pirate Planet three and a half out of four stars, describing the story as "quite clever" and "fun", but felt that it was let down by over-the-top acting. In 2010, Charlie Jane Anders of io9 listed the cliffhanger of the third episode as one of the best cliffhangers in Doctor Who history.

== Commercial releases ==
=== In print ===
Doctor Who – The Pirate Planet
- Author: James Goss
- Series: Doctor Who novelisations
- Publisher: BBC Books
- Publication date: 5 January 2017
- Pages: 416
- ISBN: 978-1-849-90677-7

BBC Books published a novelised version of the serial, written by James Goss, on 5 January 2017. An abridged Target Books edition titled Doctor Who and the Pirate Planet was published in paperback 11 March 2021. It will be included in The Key to Time collection on 29 October 2026.

=== Home media ===
It was released on VHS on 3 April 1995. Along with the rest of season sixteen, it was released in North America as part of the Key to Time box set, and as an individually available title, on 1 October 2002; the remastered Key To Time Boxset was released in Region 1 on 3 March 2009. A Limited Edition of the Key to Time box set (with additional clean-up and extras over the North American release) containing this serial, was released in Region 2 on 24 September 2007. The same set, though not in Limited Edition guise was released in Region 4 on 7 November 2007. The serial is not available separately on DVD in Regions 2 or 4. This serial was also released as part of the Doctor Who DVD Files in Issue 112 on 17 April 2013.
