= Doctor Who season 16 =

1978–79 season of British sci-fi TV series

Doctor Who
- Season 16
- DVD box set cover art
- Starring: Tom Baker; Mary Tamm; John Leeson
- No. of stories: 6
- No. of episodes: 26

Release
- Original network: BBC1
- Original release: 2 September 1978 – 24 February 1979

Season chronology
- ← Previous; Season 15 Next → Season 17

The sixteenth season of British science fiction television series Doctor Who, known collectively as The Key to Time, began on 2 September 1978 with The Ribos Operation and ended with The Armageddon Factor. The arc was originally conceived by producer Graham Williams, who had proposed it as part of his application for the producer's job in 1976. The name refers to a powerful artefact, the segments of which are what the Fourth Doctor and his companions, Romana and K9, search for during the season. Anthony Read continued in his role as script editor from the previous season.

== Synopsis ==
A figure calling himself the White Guardian commissions the Doctor and K9, assisted by a new companion, the Time Lady Romana, to find the six segments of the Key to Time, a cosmic artefact resembling a perfect cube that maintains the equilibrium of the universe. Since it is too powerful for any single being to possess, it has been split into six different segments and scattered across space and time, disguised by the raw elemental power within them into any shape or size. However, since the forces balancing the universe are so upset, the White Guardian needs to recover the segments of the Key to stop the universe so that he can restore the balance. The White Guardian also warns the Doctor of the Black Guardian, who also wishes to obtain the Key to Time for his own purposes. In the final episode, the Black Guardian, disguised as the White Guardian, attempts to take the Key from the Doctor. However, the Doctor sees through the figure's charade and orders the segments of the Key to Time to once again become scattered across all of time and space, bar the sixth, which he reinstates as Princess Astra. Afterward, the Doctor decides to install a device called a randomiser into the TARDIS' navigation system for a period of time to make his following voyages unpredictable to evade the Black Guardian.

=== The six segments ===
In some stories, the segment in its disguised form is an integral part of the story, whereas in others, the segment is merely an incidental object.

1. The first segment is disguised as a lump of Jethrik, a valuable rock mineral on the planet Ribos.
2. The second is the planet Calufrax, shrunk to miniature size by the space-hopping pirate planet of Zanak.
3. The third is the Great Seal of Diplos, a jewelled pendant which had been stolen by a criminal of that planet and brought to Earth.
4. The fourth is part of a statue on the planet Tara.
5. The fifth was an unspecified religious artifact that had been consumed by a squid on the swamp world of Delta Magna's third moon, causing it to turn into a gigantic monster named Kroll that the natives worship as a god.
6. The final segment is a woman, the Princess Astra of the planet Atrios.

== Casting ==
=== Main cast ===
- Tom Baker as the Fourth Doctor
- Mary Tamm as Romana
- John Leeson as Voice of K9

Tom Baker continued his role as the Fourth Doctor, and saw the introduction of Romana played by Mary Tamm. This season was the only one to feature Tamm as the first incarnation of Romana, as Tamm left the programme after only one season because she felt that the character had reverted to the traditional assistant role and could not be developed further. The second incarnation, played by Lalla Ward (who also appeared in this season as Princess Astra), began her run in the first serial of the next season (Destiny of the Daleks).

== Serials ==
Douglas Adams took over as script editor from Anthony Read for The Armageddon Factor. Season 16 consists of one long story arc encompassing six separate, linked stories.

No. story	No. in season	Serial title	Episode titles	Directed by	Written by	Original release date	Prod. code	UK viewers (millions)	AI
98	1	The Ribos Operation	"Part One"	George Spenton-Foster	Robert Holmes	2 September 1978	5A	8.3	59
98	1	The Ribos Operation	"Part Two"	George Spenton-Foster	Robert Holmes	9 September 1978	5A	8.1	—
98	1	The Ribos Operation	"Part Three"	George Spenton-Foster	Robert Holmes	16 September 1978	5A	7.9	—
98	1	The Ribos Operation	"Part Four"	George Spenton-Foster	Robert Holmes	23 September 1978	5A	8.2	67
The Doctor is recruited by the White Guardian to seek the six segments of the Key to Time. The quest for the first segment takes them to Ribos, a medieval planet that galactic confidence trickster Garron is trying to sell to the Graff Vynda-K.
99	2	The Pirate Planet	"Part One"	Pennant Roberts	Douglas Adams	30 September 1978	5B	9.1	61
99	2	The Pirate Planet	"Part Two"	Pennant Roberts	Douglas Adams	7 October 1978	5B	7.4	—
99	2	The Pirate Planet	"Part Three"	Pennant Roberts	Douglas Adams	14 October 1978	5B	8.2	64
99	2	The Pirate Planet	"Part Four"	Pennant Roberts	Douglas Adams	21 October 1978	5B	8.4	64
The quest for the second segment takes them to the planet Zanak, which has been hollowed out and fitted with hyperspace engines, allowing its insane cyborg Captain to materialise it around other smaller planets and plunder their resources.
100	3	The Stones of Blood	"Part One"	Darrol Blake	David Fisher	28 October 1978	5C	8.6	—
100	3	The Stones of Blood	"Part Two"	Darrol Blake	David Fisher	4 November 1978	5C	6.6	—
100	3	The Stones of Blood	"Part Three"	Darrol Blake	David Fisher	11 November 1978	5C	9.3	—
100	3	The Stones of Blood	"Part Four"	Darrol Blake	David Fisher	18 November 1978	5C	7.6	67
The quest for the third segment takes them to Earth, where an ancient criminal who stole the segment disguises herself as the Celtic goddess Cailleach.
101	4	The Androids of Tara	"Part One"	Michael Hayes	David Fisher	25 November 1978	5D	9.5	—
101	4	The Androids of Tara	"Part Two"	Michael Hayes	David Fisher	2 December 1978	5D	10.1	65
101	4	The Androids of Tara	"Part Three"	Michael Hayes	David Fisher	9 December 1978	5D	8.9	—
101	4	The Androids of Tara	"Part Four"	Michael Hayes	David Fisher	16 December 1978	5D	9.0	66
The quest for the fourth segment takes them to the planet Tara. The Fourth Doctor and Romana find themselves embroiled in the political games of the planet Tara, where doppelgangers, android or otherwise, complicate the coronation of Prince Reynart.
102	5	The Power of Kroll	"Part One"	Norman Stewart	Robert Holmes	23 December 1978	5E	6.5	—
102	5	The Power of Kroll	"Part Two"	Norman Stewart	Robert Holmes	30 December 1978	5E	12.4	—
102	5	The Power of Kroll	"Part Three"	Norman Stewart	Robert Holmes	6 January 1979	5E	8.9	—
102	5	The Power of Kroll	"Part Four"	Norman Stewart	Robert Holmes	13 January 1979	5E	9.9	63
The quest for the fifth segment takes them to the third moon of Delta Magna, caught in the middle of a dispute between the crew of a methane refinery and the natives (known as 'Swampies').
103	6	The Armageddon Factor	"Part One"	Michael Hayes	Bob Baker and Dave Martin	20 January 1979	5F	7.5	65
103	6	The Armageddon Factor	"Part Two"	Michael Hayes	Bob Baker and Dave Martin	27 January 1979	5F	8.8	—
103	6	The Armageddon Factor	"Part Three"	Michael Hayes	Bob Baker and Dave Martin	3 February 1979	5F	7.8	—
103	6	The Armageddon Factor	"Part Four"	Michael Hayes	Bob Baker and Dave Martin	10 February 1979	5F	8.6	—
103	6	The Armageddon Factor	"Part Five"	Michael Hayes	Bob Baker and Dave Martin	17 February 1979	5F	8.6	—
103	6	The Armageddon Factor	"Part Six"	Michael Hayes	Bob Baker and Dave Martin	24 February 1979	5F	9.6	66
The quest for the sixth and final segment takes them to Atrios, a world at war with its planetary neighbour Zeos. But the Black Guardian is closing in.

== Production ==
=== Scrapped stories ===
Writer Ted Lewis drafted the story Shield of Zareg, which would have depicted the Doctor and Romana travelling to Nottingham, meeting Robin Hood, and discovering he is a villain. The scripts were deemed unsuitable by the production team and replaced by The Androids of Tara. A storyline by Chris Boucher was submitted, involving a remote Earth outpost under attack, but scrapped. A storyline by Douglas Adams depicted the Time Lords mining a planet and sapping aggression from the natives. One Time Lord, turned to stone, would absorb the aggression, and, driven insane, he plans to make the machine re-form around Gallifrey and hollow out the planet. Elements from the plotline were recycled for The Pirate Planet. Another storyline by Bob Baker and Dave Martin would have seen two planets at war, encouraged by a force called the Shadow, which forces the Doctor to fashion a Key to Time to temporarily freeze their forces before redirecting them to destroy the Shadow's planet. Elements of this story were recycled for The Armageddon Factor.

== Broadcast ==
The Key to Time was broadcast from 2 September 1978 to 24 February 1979.

== Home media ==
=== VHS releases ===
Season	Story no.	Serial name	Duration	Release date		
Season	Story no.	Serial name	Duration	UK	Australia	USA / Canada
16	98	The Ribos Operation	4 × 25 min	April 1995	June 1995	September 1996
16	99	The Pirate Planet	4 × 25 min	April 1995	June 1995	September 1996
16	100	The Stones of Blood	4 × 25 min	May 1995	July 1995	March 1996
16	101	The Androids of Tara	4 × 25 min	May 1995	July 1995	March 1996
16	102	The Power of Kroll	4 × 25 min	June 1995	August 1995	September 1996
16	103	The Armageddon Factor	6 × 25 min	June 1995	August 1995	September 1996

=== DVD and Blu-ray releases ===
All releases are for DVD

Season	Story no.	Serial name	Duration	Release date		
Season	Story no.	Serial name	Duration	R2	R4	R1
16	98–103	The Key to Time (Note: Stories available in Region 1 only, with minimal restoration and extras (individually or as a box set))	26 × 25 min.	—N/a	—N/a	1 October 2002
16	98–103	The Key to Time: The Ribos Operation; The Pirate Planet; The Stones of Blood; The Androids of Tara; The Power of Kroll; The Armageddon Factor	26 × 25 min. (Note: Special edition. Known collectively as The Key to Time. Only available as a box set in Regions 2 and 4. Stories available individually or as a box set in Region 1. All serials contain four episodes each, apart from The Armageddon Factor, which has six episodes.)	24 September 2007 (Note: Limited release); 16 November 2009 (Note: Re-release)	7 November 2007	3 March 2009

== In print ==
Season	Story no.	Library no. (Note: Number in Target's Doctor Who Library, if applicable)	Novelisation title	Author	Hardcover release date (Note: Published by Target's parent companies (Allen Wingate, W. H. Allen, BBC Books) unless otherwise indicated)	Paperback release date (Note: Published by Target Books (or by BBC Books under the Target Collection umbrella) unless otherwise indicated)	Audiobook	
Season	Story no.	Library no.	Novelisation title	Author	Hardcover release date	Paperback release date	Release date (Note: Unabridged from BBC Audio / AudioGo unless otherwise indicated)	Narrator
16	098	52	Doctor Who and the Ribos Operation	Ian Marter	13 December 1979		3 March 2011	John Leeson
16	098	—N/a	The Ribos Operation (Note: Published as part of The Key to Time collection)	James Goss	29 October 2026	TBA	April 2027	TBA
16	099	—N/a	The Pirate Planet (unabridged)	James Goss	5 January 2017	1 February 2018 (Note: Published by BBC Books)	5 January 2017	Jon Culshaw
16	099	—N/a	Doctor Who and the Pirate Planet (abridged)	James Goss	29 October 2026 (Note: Titled simply The Pirate Planet)	11 March 2021	—N/a	
16	100	59	Doctor Who and the Stones of Blood	Terrance Dicks	20 March 1980		4 June 2026	Geoffrey Beevers (Note: K9 voice performed by John Leeson)
16	100	—N/a	The Stones of Blood	David Fisher	29 October 2026	14 July 2022	5 May 2011	Susan Engel
16	101	3	Doctor Who and the Androids of Tara	Terrance Dicks	24 April 1980		5 November 2026	Geoffrey Beevers
16	101	—N/a	The Androids of Tara	David Fisher	29 October 2026	14 July 2022	5 July 2012	John Leeson
16	102	49	Doctor Who and the Power of Kroll	Terrance Dicks	29 May 1980		7 October 2021	Geoffrey Beevers
16	102	—N/a	The Power of Kroll	Robert Shearman	29 October 2026	TBA	April 2027	TBA
16	103	5	Doctor Who and the Armageddon Factor	Terrance Dicks	26 June 1980		6 June 2019	John Leeson
16	103	—N/a	The Armageddon Factor	James Goss	29 October 2026	TBA	April 2027	TBA
