= The Stones of Blood =

100 – The Stones of Blood
- Doctor Who serial

Cast
- Doctor: Tom Baker – Fourth Doctor
- Companions: Mary Tamm – Romana; John Leeson (Voice of K9)
- Others: Beatrix Lehmann – Professor Rumford; Susan Engel – Vivien Fay; Nicholas McArdle – De Vries; Elaine Ives-Cameron – Martha; James Murray, Shirin Taylor – Campers; David McAlister, Gerald Cross – Megara Voices

Production
- Directed by: Darrol Blake
- Written by: David Fisher
- Script editor: Anthony Read
- Produced by: Graham Williams
- Executive producer: None
- Music by: Dudley Simpson
- Production code: 5C
- Series: Season 16
- Running time: 4 episodes, 25 minutes each
- First broadcast: 28 October – 18 November 1978

Chronology
← Preceded by The Pirate Planet	Followed by → The Androids of Tara

The Stones of Blood is the third serial of the 16th season of the British science fiction television series Doctor Who, which was first broadcast in four weekly parts on BBC1 from 28 October to 18 November 1978. Part 4 was broadcast during the week of the show's fifteenth anniversary.

The serial is set in and around an English stone circle and on a prison spaceship in hyperspace. In the serial, the criminal Cessair of Diplos (Susan Engel) is hiding on Earth after escaping the ship before being prosecuted for stealing the Great Seal of Diplos, the third segment of the powerful Key to Time.

== Plot ==
Tracking the third segment of the Key to Time, the Fourth Doctor, Romana, and K9 arrive in modern-day (1978) Cornwall. They meet Professor Emilia Rumford and her friend Vivien Fay, studying the "Nine Travellers"--standing stones in Boscombe Moor. Their work is disrupted by a Druidic sect that worships the Cailleach, the Druidic goddess of war and magic, led by de Vries. De Vries and the sect are hostile to the newcomers, but the Doctor later finds the sect killed by mobile stones similar to those of the Nine Travellers and determines the stones must be alien beings that feed on blood. He and Emilia find evidence that suggests Vivien is older than she looks. Meanwhile, Romana catches Vivien awakening more stones with blood, and Vivien uses a device to send her to a spacecraft in hyperspace. When the Doctor and Emilia arrive, Vivien tells them that Romana will be safe before disappearing herself. The Doctor recognises the stones as Ogri, a life form from the planet Ogros.

The Doctor constructs a projector to cross into hyperspace, leaving Emilia and K9 to guard it. On the spacecraft, the Doctor determines it is a prison ship, and inadvertently releases two floating globes called Megara that serve as justice machines. They accuse the Doctor of breaking a seal on the ship and prepare to put him on trial. Elsewhere, Vivien finds the Doctor's presence, and returns to Earth, awakening one of the Ogri and damages the Doctor's projector, but sparing Emilia's life as a friend. She and the Ogri return to the craft to attend the Doctor's trial. K9 guides Emilia in repairing the projector, allowing them to bring back Romana, along with an Ogri. They are pursued by the Ogri, leading them back to Vivien's cottage. There, Romana discovers an alien device that proves Vivien is not human. They lure the Ogri back to the projector, and she and the Ogri return to the spacecraft.

On the ship, the Doctor learns the Megara are seeking a criminal known as Cessair, who had stolen the Great Seal of the planet Diplos, which grants its bearer great powers. The Doctor suspects Vivien is Cessair, and attempts to force the Megara to question her, but their law prevents such intervention. Having decided the Doctor's guilt, they fire an energy weapon at him, but at the last moment, the Doctor drags Vivien into the shot. The Megara immediately stop their attack and scan Vivien to see if she is unharmed, but instead discover that she is Cessair. Romana arrives with the additional evidence, and the Megara pass judgement on her. They return her to Earth and transform her into a standing stone in the moor, but not before the Doctor recovers the Great Seal which she wore. The Megara are about to pass judgment on the Doctor when they're forced to return to their ship and depart to Diplos. The Doctor had set the controls of the ship before leaving, and he affirms the Great Seal is the third segment of the Key, and he, Romana, and K9 thank Emilia for her assistance before they leave in the TARDIS. She smiles as she now has a new stone in the circle to study.

== Production ==
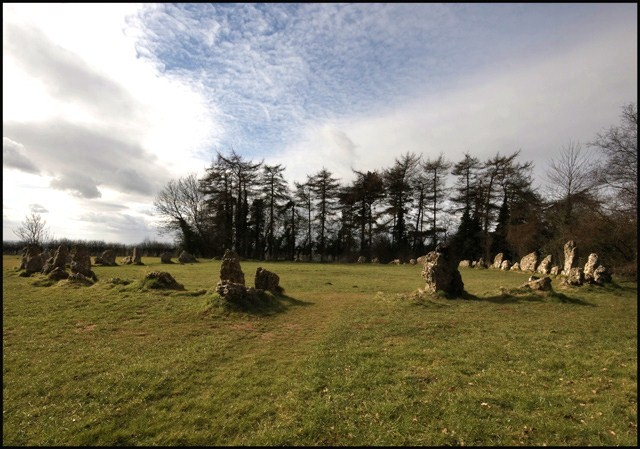
The serial was filmed on location at the Rollright Stones in Oxfordshire

Working titles for this story included The Nine Maidens and The Stones of Time. Contrary to usual practice, the location footage in this story was shot on professional video cameras using outside broadcasting facilities, a decision by the director to avoid the jarring effect when cutting between 16mm film and video. The main location was the Rollright Stones, a megalithic site in Oxfordshire, England. The setting of the story however was Boscawen, in Cornwall, at the Boscawen-Un stone circle. An actual legend of the site states that it is impossible to count the stones. As the serial ends, the Doctor notes that the number of stones in the circle has changed (due to the removal of 3 Ogri and the addition of Cessair's imprisoned form) and suggests Professor Rumford write a monograph about it.

Part One's cliff-hanger called for a scene in which Cessair, disguised as the Doctor, pushed Romana off the cliff. Baker objected to the scene, as he felt it would be very upsetting to children to see the Doctor as a threat. Instead the scene was filmed so that the viewer never sees who pushed Romana. The fifteenth anniversary of the programme took place on 23 November 1978, five days after the broadcast of episode four. To commemorate this, Anthony Read asked David Fisher to write a new scene (expanded by Darrol Blake) featuring Romana and K9 surprising the Doctor with a cake celebrating his 751st birthday and a new, identical scarf. However, producer Graham Williams vetoed this idea as being too self-indulgent, and the scene was never shot. Blake had already ordered a cake, and this was eventually eaten by the cast and crew.

This was one of only two stories between Frontier in Space and the end of the series' initial run not to have the special sounds created by Dick Mills. Due to Mills suffering a brief illness, Elizabeth Parker provided the sound effects instead.

=== Cast notes ===
Director Darrol Blake originally offered the role of Vivien to Honor Blackman, who declined the part as she felt Beatrix Lehmann had all the best material. Blake then asked Maria Aitken, who wasn't interested. Susan Engel was finally hired for the part. An uncredited Gerald Cross provided the voice of the White Guardian. Elaine Ives-Cameron later played Ms Lavish in the audio play The Stones of Venice.

== Broadcast and reception ==
Episode	Title	Run time	Original release date	UK viewers (millions)
1	"Part One"	24:20	28 October 1978	8.6
2	"Part Two"	23:53	4 November 1978	6.6
3	"Part Three"	24:27	11 November 1978	9.3
4	"Part Four"	23:07	18 November 1978	7.6

In their book The Discontinuity Guide (1995), Paul Cornell, Martin Day, and Keith Topping praised the "Hammeresque" first two episodes, but criticised the "woeful" final two episodes, ultimately writing that "the story disappoints as whole acres of motivation and background are glossed over". In The Television Companion (1998), David J. Howe and Stephen James Walker were more positive, calling it "extremely good". They praised the directing and noted that the "wide variety of different plot elements and two highly contrasting settings, manages to encapsulate much of what has made the series so successful over the years". In 2011, Patrick Mulkern of Radio Times described The Stones of Blood as "an intriguing yarn with small stakes and vivid characters", particularly praising the female roles. DVD Talk's Justin Felix gave the serial four out of five stars, describing it as "a fun Doctor Who romp". He opined that the Ogri were "arguably the best part of this serial ... a hysterically fun group of monsters".

== Commercial releases ==
=== In print ===
Doctor Who and the Stones of Blood
- Author: Terrance Dicks
- Cover artist: Andrew Skilleter
- Series: Doctor Who book: Target novelisations
- Release number: 59
- Publisher: Target Books
- Publication date: 20 March 1980
- ISBN: 0-426-20099-3

Terrance Dicks' novelisation was published by Target Books in March 1980. An audiobook release using a brand new novelisation written for audio by David Fisher and narrated by Susan Engel who portrayed Viven Fay in the broadcast version was released. This David Fisher novelisation was released in paperback on 14 July 2022 as part of the Target Collection. An audiobook of the original Dicks novelisation was released 4 June 2026. The Fisher novelisation will be included in The Key to Time collection 29 October 2026.

=== Home media ===
It was released on VHS on 1 May 1995 and contained an extended cut of episode two, which featured a longer exchange between de Vries and his mistress before they were attacked by the Ogri. The scene is contained in full in the deleted scenes package on the later DVD release, which contains the episode as televised.

This serial, along with the rest of season sixteen, was released as part of the Key to Time box set, which was released on region 2 DVD on 24 September 2007. This serial was also released as part of the Doctor Who DVD Files in issue 67 on 27 July 2011.

== Bibliography ==
- Howe, David J.; Stammers, Mark; Walker, Stephen James (1992). Doctor Who The Handbook – The Fourth Doctor. London: Doctor Who Books. ISBN 0-426-20369-0.
