= The Power of Kroll =

102 – The Power of Kroll
- Doctor Who serial

Cast
- Doctor: Tom Baker – Fourth Doctor
- Companion: Mary Tamm – Romana
- Others: Neil McCarthy – Thawn; Philip Madoc – Fenner; John Leeson – Dugeen; Grahame Mallard – Harg; Glyn Owen – Rohm-Dutt; John Abineri – Ranquin; Carl Rigg – Varlik; Frank Jarvis – Skart; Terry Walsh – Mensch

Production
- Directed by: Norman Stewart
- Written by: Robert Holmes
- Script editor: Anthony Read
- Produced by: Graham Williams; John Nathan-Turner (uncredited)
- Executive producer: None
- Music by: Dudley Simpson
- Production code: 5E
- Series: Season 16
- Running time: 4 episodes, 25 minutes each
- First broadcast: 23 December 1978
- Last broadcast: 13 January 1979

Chronology
← Preceded by The Androids of Tara	Followed by → The Armageddon Factor

The Power of Kroll is the fifth serial of the 16th season of the British science fiction television series Doctor Who, which was first broadcast in four weekly parts on BBC1 from 23 December 1978 to 13 January 1979.

The serial is set on the third moon of the human colony world Delta Magna. In the serial, a methane catalysing refinery's operations in the swamp disturbs the giant squid Kroll, which grew in size after ingesting the fifth segment of the powerful Key to Time. When Kroll surfaces, it subsequently rampages on the moon.

== Plot ==
The Fourth Doctor and Romana have arrived on the third moon of Delta Magna, searching for the penultimate segment of the Key to Time. They find themselves caught in the middle of a dispute between the crew of a methane refinery and the natives (known as 'Swampies'). The Swampies claim that the crew have disturbed the waters, and will incur the wrath of their god, Kroll. Kroll is revealed to be a giant squid, which surfaces to feed every few centuries and is the source of the abnormally large amount of methane being mined. Originally a normal size squid, Kroll ingested the fifth segment of the Key to Time and began to grow, becoming a god-like figure to the Swampies and their descendants.

After Kroll awakens and begins to attack both the Swampies and the refinery indiscriminately, the Doctor uses the tracer to retrieve the segment of the Key, which destroys Kroll and instigates cellular regeneration within the creature to produce hundreds of normal-sized squid. This process not only saves the planet's inhabitants but removes the source of methane from the refinery. The Doctor and Romana return to the TARDIS and set off on their next adventure.

== Production ==
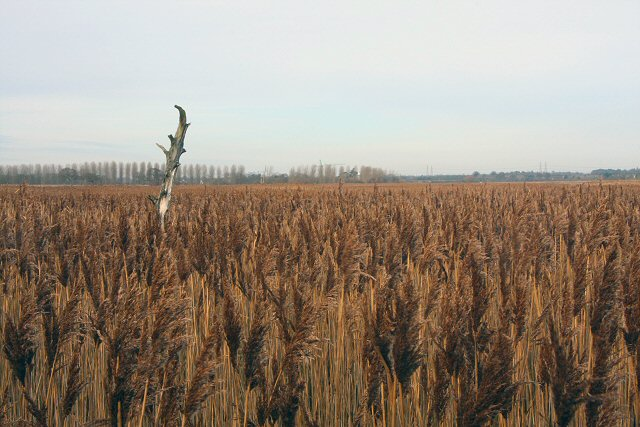
Location filming took place in the River Alde reed beds at Snape, Suffolk

When script editor Anthony Read asked Robert Holmes to write the story, there were two requirements: that it include the largest monster in series history and that Holmes minimise the humour that many scripts from the era were known for. This second requirement was a request from higher up at the BBC. Early titles for the story were The Shield of Time, Moon of Death and Horror of the Swamp. Holmes said that he considered the idea of a large monster a mistake given the budgetary constraints at the BBC and named The Power of Kroll as his least favourite Doctor Who story.

Extensive location filming took place in Snape, Suffolk around the River Alde from Monday 18 September 1978 to represent the marshes featured in the script. Nine days of location filming were afforded to the serial, including two night shoots, more than is usual for a Doctor Who story. Studio sequences were taped during October 1978. The serial was directed by Norman Stewart, who had directed the Underworld story a year previously. This was his final assignment on the programme. The actors playing Swampies were coloured green with a special water-resistant dye ordered from Germany. Unfortunately, the make-up artist failed to order the special dye remover, with the result that many of the actors had to take chemical baths to get the green dye off, and many had a green tint for a long period after production was finished. Costume designer Colin Lavers introduced a new tweed coat for the Doctor, which sported four flying duck brooches on its lapels. Around this time, producer Graham Williams fell ill and his duties were taken on by Anthony Read and production unit manager John Nathan-Turner, assisted by Blake's 7 producer David Maloney.

=== Cast notes ===
Among the cast were a number of actors who had previously appeared in Doctor Who playing other characters. The most notable of these was Philip Madoc who had previously appeared in The Krotons (1968–69), The War Games (1969) and The Brain of Morbius (1976). He had initially been invited to play Thawn, but the role was given to George Baker, who then pulled out. Madoc agreed to play the part of Fenner when Alan Browning, who was slated to play Fenner, fell ill before the start of production, but was dissatisfied with the role. John Leeson, best known as the voice of K9, appears in this story as Dugeen. This is his only on-screen appearance in Doctor Who which he was offered due to the fact that K9 was not scripted to appear in this story. (The role had previously been offered to Martin Jarvis.) Neil McCarthy previously played George Barnham in The Mind of Evil (1971), while John Abineri previously played Van Lutyens in Fury from the Deep (1968), General Carrington in The Ambassadors of Death (1970) and Richard Railton in Death to the Daleks (1974).

== Broadcast and reception ==
Episode	Title	Run time	Original release date	UK viewers (millions)
1	"Part One"	23:16	23 December 1978	6.5
2	"Part Two"	23:57	30 December 1978	12.4
3	"Part Three"	21:56	6 January 1979	8.9
4	"Part Four"	21:58	13 January 1979	9.9

Part One was broadcast only a few hours after BBC1 had come back on-air following a strike. The channel had ceased transmitting programmes after the early evening news on Wednesday 20 December and the dispute was resolved in time for services to resume at 3pm on Saturday 23 December. (BBC2 had been similarly affected, and BBC Radio operated a reduced service.) This disruption accounts for the large drop in ratings compared with the preceding episode, Part Four of The Androids of Tara, which was watched by 9m viewers. By contrast Part Two of The Power of Kroll aired during the week between Christmas and New Year, when viewing figures are often higher, and was watched by nearly twice as many people as Part One: BBC ratings were also boosted by a strike which had taken the Yorkshire region of ITV off-air for the entire Christmas period.

In their book The Discontinuity Guide (1995), Paul Cornell, Martin Day, and Keith Topping wrote that The Power of Kroll was "very slow" with little humour, and "horribly acted" aside from Madoc and Abineri. They also criticised the "unconvincing" realisation of Kroll. In 2011, Mark Braxton of Radio Times gave a negative review of the serial, describing it as uninteresting with poor effects, "tepid dialogue and dull characters". However, he felt that some parts were "enlivened by Tom Baker's sprightly performance". DVD Talk's Justin Felix gave the story two and a half out of five stars, calling it the "least inspired" story of The Key to Time. While he praised Baker and Tamm and their dialogue, he criticised the "flimsy" concept and the Swampies.

The Power of Kroll was voted at #174 by readers of Doctor Who Magazine in a 2009 poll of the top 200 stories — the fifth lowest of any Tom Baker story.

== Commercial Releases ==
=== In print ===
Doctor Who and the Power of Kroll
- Author: Terrance Dicks
- Cover artist: Andrew Skilleter
- Series: Doctor Who book: Target novelisations
- Release number: 49
- Publisher: Target Books
- Publication date: 26 May 1980
- ISBN: 0-426-20101-9

A novelisation of this serial, written by Terrance Dicks, was published by Target Books in May 1980. A new novelisation by Robert Shearman will be included in The Key to Time collection 29 October 2026.

=== Home media ===
The Power of Kroll was released on VHS on 5 June 1995. This serial, along with the rest of season sixteen, was released as part of the Key to Time box set on region 2 DVD on 24 September 2007, and in Region 1 on 3 March 2009.
