= Neil McCarthy (actor) =

English actor (1932–1985)

- McCarthy in Steptoe and Son Ride Again (1973)
- Born: Eugene Neil McCarthy; 26 July 1932; Lincoln, Lincolnshire, England
- Died: 5 February 1985 (aged 52); Fordingbridge, Hampshire, England
- Occupation: Actor
- Years active: 1959–1982

Eugene Neil McCarthy (26 July 1932 – 5 February 1985) was an English actor known for his dramatic physical appearance caused by acromegaly.

== Early life ==
Born in Lincoln, Lincolnshire, the son of Sleaford dentist Eugene Charles McCarthy (1899–1954) and Beatrice Annie (née Corney, 1901–1978), McCarthy was educated at Stamford School (where his contemporaries included cricketer M. J. K. Smith and author Colin Dexter) before reading modern languages at Trinity College Dublin, and trained as a Latin and French teacher. He could also speak fluent Greek.

== Career ==
After his teacher training, McCarthy appeared in repertory theatre in Oxford, at the Edinburgh Festival Fringe and in the West End.

McCarthy's film credits include memorable roles as Welsh soldier Private Thomas in Zulu (1964), as Sergeant Jock McPherson in Where Eagles Dare (1968), as Gates in The Ruffians (1973), as the villain Calibos in Clash of the Titans (1981) and as a robber in Time Bandits (1981). His television credits include Catweazle Play for Today ("When the Bough Breaks"), Barnaby Rudge, Man of the World, Danger Man, The Avengers, The Saint, Z-Cars, Dixon of Dock Green, Great Expectations, Randall and Hopkirk (Deceased), Catweazle, My Wife Next Door (A Sense of Movement), Softly, Softly: Task Force, Department S, Who Pays the Ferryman?, Return of the Saint, Doctor Who (in the serials The Mind of Evil and The Power of Kroll), Enemy at the Door, Shogun, The Professionals, Some Mothers Do 'Ave 'Em, Only When I Laugh, The Gentle Touch and Emmerdale Farm, and the television adaptation of the Lord Peter Wimsey novel, The Nine Tailors.

He died of motor neurone disease in Fordingbridge, Hampshire in 1985, aged 52.

== Selected filmography ==
- Breakout (1959) – Chandler's henchman (uncredited)
- The Square Ring (1959)
- Sands of the Desert (1960) – Hassan
- Barnaby Rudge (1960) – Hugh (TV mini-series)
- The Criminal (1960) – O'Hara
- Offbeat (1961) – Leo Farrell
- Solo for Sparrow (1962) – Dusty
- The Pot Carriers (1962) – Bracket
- We Joined the Navy (1962) – Sergeant
- Two Left Feet (1963) – Ted (uncredited)
- The Cracksman (1963) – Van Gogh
- Zulu (1964) – Private Thomas
- The Hill (1965) – Burton
- Cuckoo Patrol (1967) – Superman No.2
- Great Expectations (1967) – Joe Gargery (TV mini-series)
- Seven Times Seven (1968) – Mr. Docherty
- Where Eagles Dare (1968) – Sgt. Jock MacPherson
- Department S (1968, TV series) – Quince in the episode A Ticket to Nowhere
- Catweazle (1970, TV series) – Sam Woodyard
- Doctor Who: The Mind of Evil (1971) – George Patrick Barnham
- Play for Today (1971, TV series) – Eddie Gosse in the episode "When the Bough Breaks"
- Follow Me! (1972) – Parkinson
- The Zoo Robbery (1973) – Skipper
- Steptoe and Son Ride Again (1973) – Lennie
- Some Mothers Do 'Ave 'Em (1973) - Take A Break, Take A Husband, aka "The Hotel" (S1 E4) - Mr Bedford (Hotel Manager)
- Operation Daybreak (1975) – Man at Quarry (uncredited)
- Side by Side (1975) – Alf (uncredited)
- Fern, the Red Deer (1976) – Poacher
- Trial by Combat (1976) – Ben Willoughby
- The Ghosts of Motley Hall (1976) – Professor Pogmore
- The Incredible Sarah (1976) – Sergeant
- Doctor Who: The Power of Kroll (1978-1979) – Thawn
- Measure for Measure (1979) – Abhorson
- Shōgun (1980, TV series) – Spillbergen
- George and Mildred (1980) – Eddie
- The Monster Club (1980) – Watson – B-Squad Member
- The Professionals (1980, TV series) – Sam Armitage
- Clash of the Titans (1981) – Calibos
- Time Bandits (1981) – 2nd Robber
- Nancy Astor (1982, TV series) – Reverend Neve
