= Romana (Doctor Who) =

Fictional character in the TV series Doctor Who

- Doctor Who character
- Mary Tamm (left) and Lalla Ward (right) as the two TV incarnations of Romana
- First appearance: The Ribos Operation (1978)
- Last appearance: "The Five Doctors" (1983)
- Portrayed by: Mary Tamm (1978–1979); Lalla Ward (1979–1981, 1983)
- Non-canonical appearances: Dimensions in Time (1993) (Lalla Ward)
- Duration: 1978–1981, 1983, 1993

In-universe information
- Full name: Romanadvoratrelundar
- Nickname: Romana
- Species: Time Lord
- Occupation: Lord President
- Affiliation: Fourth Doctor
- Home: Gallifrey
- Home era: Rassilon Era

Romanadvoratrelundar (/roʊmɑːnə.dvərˌætrəˈlʊndər/), (Note: In her first appearance in The Ribos Operation, Mary Tamm pronounced her character's name with an 'n' instead of an 'r', i.e. as if spelled "Romanadvoratnelundar (/roʊmɑːnə.dvərˌæ.t.nəˈlʊndər/). It was also pronounced with an 'n' as well as an extra vowel separating 'd' and 'v' in The Stones of Blood (/-dəvərˌæt.nəˈlʊndər/). However, Lalla Ward pronounced the name as spelled in Warriors' Gate (/roʊmɑːnə.dvərˌæ.trəˈlʊndər/), and this has been the primary pronunciation going forward in audio dramas.) usually shortened to Romana, is a fictional character in the long-running British science fiction television series Doctor Who. A Time Lady from the planet Gallifrey, she is a companion to the Fourth Doctor.

As a Time Lord, Romana is able to regenerate, having had two on-screen incarnations with somewhat different personalities (dubbed Romana I and Romana II by fans). Romana I was played by Mary Tamm from 1978 to 1979. When Tamm chose not to sign on for a second season, the part was recast. Romana II was played by Lalla Ward from 1979 to 1981. A third incarnation of Romana has been depicted in some of the spin-off novels, and a fourth (performed by Juliet Landau) has been featured in several audio dramas released by Big Finish Productions in 2013 and 2014, and appeared again in early 2015.

Romana is one of only two companions from the Doctor's home planet, Gallifrey, to travel with him in the original television series. The first was his granddaughter Susan Foreman.

== Romana I ==
Mary Tamm as Romana I

The White Guardian originally assigns Romana to assist the Doctor during the quest for the Key to Time, a series of linked serials which constitute the whole of Season 16 (1978–79). Romana first appears in The Ribos Operation, and was intended as a contrast to her predecessor, the savage Leela. Romana is initially haughty and somewhat arrogant, looking down on the Doctor (whom she considers to be her academic inferior) and responding to his initial resentment at her presence with icy put-downs. However, she soon gains an appreciation for the Doctor's experience and sense of adventure, and begins to respect him as a teacher.

Over the course of Season 16, Romana begins to take on some of the characteristics of the screaming "damsel in distress", which reinforced Tamm's decision not to remain in the role as she felt the character had been taken as far as she could go. As a result, Romana regenerates at the start of Season 17, emerging with a different physical appearance and a lighter personality.

Although Tamm had left the show on relatively good terms and was willing to film a regeneration sequence for the start of Season 17, she was not invited to do so. There was a rumour, purportedly started by former producer John Nathan-Turner, that the real reason Tamm left was that she was pregnant. Tamm has denied this repeatedly over the years.

== Romana II ==
Lalla Ward as Romana II

The introduction of Romana's second incarnation at the start of Destiny of the Daleks — a script credited to Terry Nation, but with several additions and alterations by script editor Douglas Adams — treats the concept of regeneration humorously; Romana changes bodily forms several times, rather like someone casually trying on different outfits, before deciding to take the form of Princess Astra, who had been played by Lalla Ward in the final serial of Season 16, The Armageddon Factor. This regeneration scene is controversial with some fans, as it does not conform to the seriousness with which regeneration is presented in most other cases. It is generally presented as traumatic, even emotionally or physically agonizing. Attempts at rationalising Romana's regeneration have been made in licensed spin-off media, including the Short Trips short story "The Lying Old Witch in the Wardrobe" which speculates that the TARDIS was responsible for her regeneration.

At the end of the serial Meglos, Romana receives word from the Time Lords recalling her to Gallifrey. The opening of the next serial Full Circle makes it clear that, having travelled with the Doctor, she no longer desires to return home. Before the issue can be resolved, the TARDIS falls through a "charged vacuum emboîtement" and disappears into another universe known as E-Space. Her final television appearance was in the 1981 story Warriors' Gate where, along with the robot dog K9, she leaves to forge her own path in E-space when faced with a choice of remaining there or returning to Gallifrey. She also appears briefly in the 20th Anniversary special "The Five Doctors" (1983) through the reuse of footage from the uncompleted 1979 story Shada, as Tom Baker declined to appear in the special.

After the departure of both Romana I and II, both versions of the character also appeared very briefly in flashback sequences during the Fourth Doctor's regeneration in Logopolis as well as the Fifth Doctor's mind-copy in Resurrection of the Daleks. Romana would also be mentioned in Castrovalva during the Fifth Doctor's post-regenerative confusion, as well as in Arc of Infinity, in which the Fifth Doctor, in response to a reprimand from the High Council of Time Lords for "leaving [her] behind", retorts that she "chose to remain in E-Space". Ward subsequently returned for a brief cameo as Romana in the 1993 charity special Dimensions in Time.

== Appearances in other media ==
Outside of the television programme, the Fourth Doctor and Romana II also appear in Australian-filmed television advertisements for PR1ME Computer, Inc. in 1980, which played in a tongue-in-cheek way with the idea that the two characters shared a romantic relationship, climaxing with the Doctor proposing marriage (which occurred in real life between Tom Baker and Lalla Ward after her departure from the series that same year).

An article by Russell T Davies in the Doctor Who Annual 2006 states that Romana was President of the Time Lords during the Last Great Time War against the Daleks (see below), which ended with Gallifrey being destroyed. As with all spin-off media, its canonicity in relation to the television series is debatable.

=== Novels ===
In the licensed Virgin New Adventures novel Blood Harvest by Terrance Dicks, Romana II leaves E-Space and returns to Gallifrey with the help of the Seventh Doctor. In Goth Opera by Paul Cornell, from the complementary Missing Adventures series, she is given a seat on the High Council of Time Lords. In New Adventures' Happy Endings, also by Cornell, it is revealed that Romana has become Lady President of Gallifrey. Romana's presidency is reflected in the later novels and in her appearances (voiced by Ward) in audio dramas from Big Finish Productions. She also makes a cameo appearance in Human Nature in a vision. Romana appears in the unlicensed fan fiction novel Time's Champion, in the role of President of the Time Lords.

Romana's appearance in the 1997 novel The Eight Doctors – where she helps the newly regenerated Eighth Doctor rescue his fourth incarnation from a group of vampires in the aftermath of State of Decay – was highlighted in a trailer for the re-launched Doctor Who range which was included on a number of BBC videos in 1997–8. The trailer used a clip from Destiny of the Daleks to illustrate Romana.

Romana's time with the Doctor is also explored in several novels, which include additional adventures for her first incarnation when outside forces divert their efforts to find the Key to Time and general adventures for her second incarnation prior to departing in E-space.

==== Romana III ====
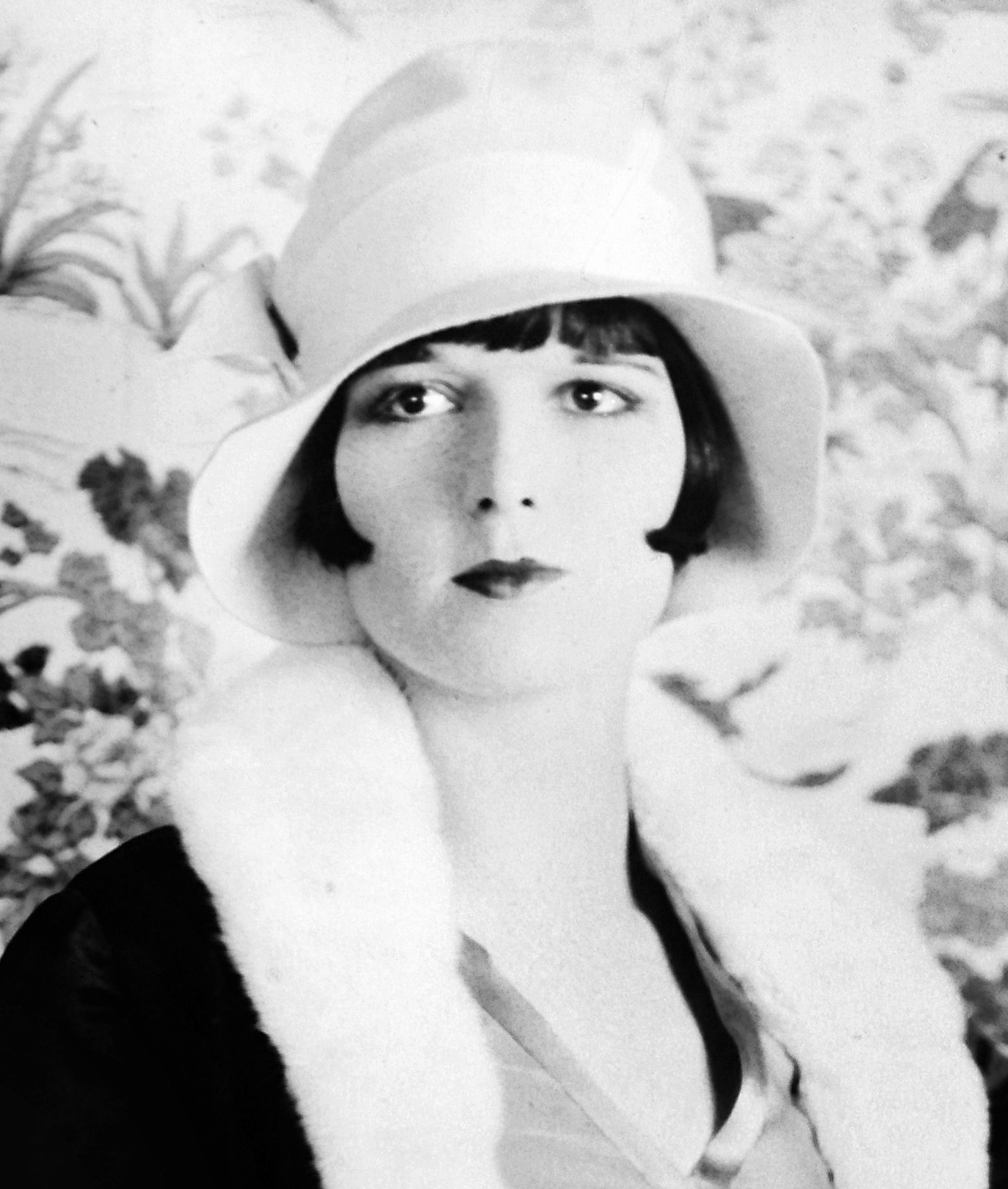
Romana's third incarnation is based on Louise Brooks

In the BBC Books Eighth Doctor Adventures novels, Romana undergoes a second regeneration, and her new incarnation (Romana III, whose appearance was modelled on silent movie actress Louise Brooks) is far less sympathetic and far more ruthless than the other two. This third incarnation pursues the Eighth Doctor in a story arc relating to the Future War, a War between the Time Lords and an as-yet-unidentified enemy, seeking to use his new companion Compassion – who has been unintentionally mutated into a Type 102 TARDIS in the aftermath of the destruction of the Doctor's own ship – as breeding stock for the new sentient TARDISes in the Future War. With the Doctor refusing to allow the Time Lords to make Compassion a slave, he, Compassion and fellow companion Fitz Kreiner go on the run between The Shadows of Avalon and The Ancestor Cell, the final confrontation on board the Doctor's believed-destroyed original TARDIS resulting in the obliteration of Gallifrey and the apparent retroactive wiping out of the Time Lords from history. A flashback in the final Eighth Doctor Adventures novel The Gallifrey Chronicles suggests that Romana is killed by Faction Paradox skulltroopers just before Gallifrey's destruction. However, it is hinted in Tomb of Valdemar by Simon Messingham that Romana may be one of a few Time Lords who survived this cataclysm, possibly in a fourth incarnation and The Gallifrey Chronicles itself suggests that the Doctor will eventually restore Gallifrey and all the dead Time Lords whose minds are stored in the Matrix, in time for its destruction again in the Time War.

=== Audio plays ===
Romana II appeared pseudonymously in a series of audio plays produced in the early 2000s by BBV. In this series, Lalla Ward played a character who appeared with K9 in an unnamed parallel universe. This character is called the Mistress (which was what K9 called Romana in the television series). Because of an unusual copyright situation in which BBV was able to license K9 but not Romana or other Doctor Who elements, the Mistress is not explicitly called Romana. For similar reasons, the parallel universe (obviously intended to reflect Romana's exile in E-Space) is called a "pocket universe" in the series' packaging.

In Big Finish's regular line of Doctor Who audio stories, Ward joined Colin Baker's Sixth Doctor in The Apocalypse Element, in which Romana is Lady President of Gallifrey. In the story, it is revealed that Romana II was abducted by the Daleks soon after assuming the presidential office, and remained in captivity for twenty years before making her escape, briefly reuniting with the Doctor before reassuming her post. Romana II also appears with Paul McGann's Eighth Doctor in the 2003 remake of Shada, an audio play produced by Big Finish for the BBC's Doctor Who website and accompanied by Macromedia Flash animations, and also in Neverland and Zagreus. More recently, she has appeared with the Fifth Doctor in The Chaos Pool, the final part of the Key 2 Time trilogy, where it is revealed that Romana's regeneration was at least partly caused by her transformation into the new sixth segment of the Key to Time, the audio concluding with the segment's essence being transferred back to Astra to save Romana's life before the Doctor destroys the Key for good.

In Neverland Romana encounters the Eighth Doctor as Anti-Time infects the Universe. With other Time Lords she travels to the Anti-Verse in the hope of finding a way to stop the flow of Anti-Time. But there she is left by Co-ordinator Vansell to the Neverpeople, those the Time Lords have erased from existence, who are planning to send Anti-Time to Gallifrey. However she helps the Doctor activate the TARDIS and stop the Anti-Time. In the sequel to this Zagreus, Romana II is forced to banish the Eighth Doctor from the universe as he has become a danger to it following his infection by the forces of "anti-time". Following on from this, she is featured in a number of audio plays with former Doctor companion Leela (played by Louise Jameson) under the umbrella title of Gallifrey.

In the audio series, Romana has to contend with the emergence of a terrorist group known as Free Time, which wants to break the technological monopoly on time travel and threatens not just Gallifrey, but its time travel-capable allies. Romana's progressive policies, including opening the academy to non-Gallifreyans, also face opposition from more conservative elements. Complicating this is the escape of an ancient evil called Pandora from the Matrix in the paradoxical form of Romana's first incarnation (played once again by Mary Tamm). Both Romana and the Pandora entity proclaim themselves Imperiatrix of Gallifrey, provoking a civil war. At the war's end, Romana destroys Pandora by trapping her in the Matrix and destroying it. She is also removed from the Presidency. With Gallifrey on the brink of economic and social collapse, as well as in danger of being overrun by a Free Time virus, Romana and her friends flee through several alternate universes. Romana encounters many versions of Gallifrey worse than her own, before finally becoming trapped in one. This Gallifrey is similar, but without the ability to time travel. After their President Romana is assassinated, she assumes her identity, regaining her office, albeit in a different universe. She is eventually able to return to her universe with a cure for the Free Time virus, although the audios then lead into early strikes by the Daleks that are apparently intended to foreshadow the Time War.

Big Finish's spin-off line The Companion Chronicles has featured new performances by both Ward and Tamm in a number of stories set within their respective continuities.

Tamm reprised the role of Romana for the final time alongside Tom Baker for a second series of original audio dramas (the first series having featured Leela) set after the Key to Time era. Recorded several months before Tamm's death in 2012, the first of these, The Auntie Matter, was released in January 2013, with a total of seven plays being released up until July 2013.

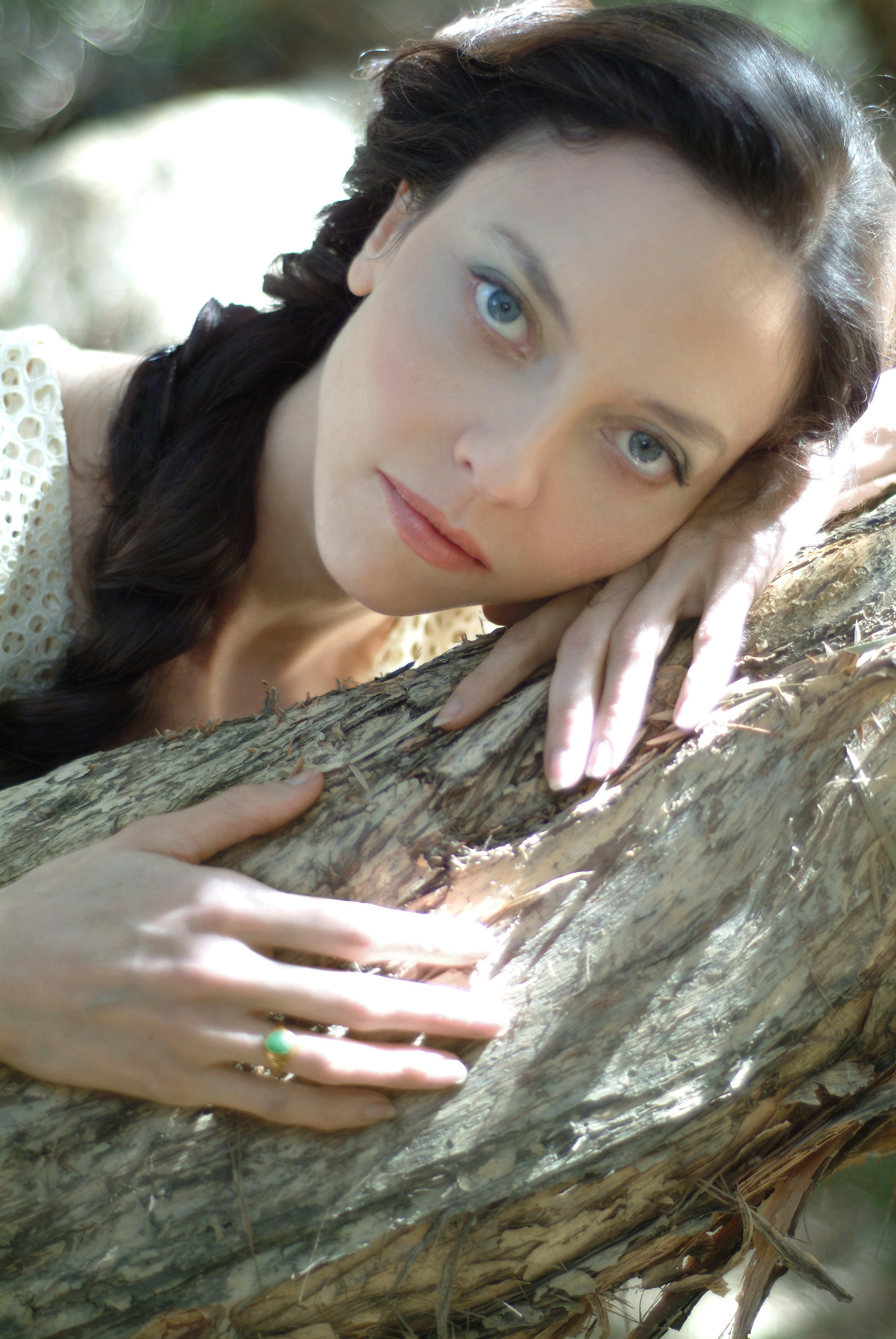
Juliet Landau portrayed a future incarnation of Romana in the sixth set of audio serials in the Gallifrey series

In July 2013 it was announced that Juliet Landau would play a future incarnation of Romana for Big Finish. This version of Romana was introduced in Renaissance, the third chapter of Gallifrey VI, released in October 2013, and was said to come from thousands of years in the future. This version of Romana was later reprised by Landau in the January 2014 audio drama Luna Romana, part of Big Finish's Companion Chronicles line; Landau also performs the role of Romana I in lieu of the now-deceased Mary Tamm in this story, the narrative intending to present Landau's Romana as looking back on the events of her first incarnation's travels with the Doctor. To avoid confusion with her earlier self, this future Romana volunteers to use the name Lady Trey (taken from one of the middle syllables of her full name). Landau returned to the role once again in Gallifrey: Intervention Earth, a continuation of the Gallifrey series released in January 2015. This story is revealed in the follow-up Enemy Lines to depict what happens shortly after Ward's incarnation is forced to regenerate and sees Gallifrey on the brink of another war. However Irving Braxiatel prevents the regeneration so that these events, including the very existence of the Landau incarnation, are undone.

In November 2013 it was revealed that Lalla Ward would reprise her role of Romana II alongside former Fourth Doctor Tom Baker and John Leeson as K9 in a pair of audio adaptations of Gareth Roberts Missing Adventure novels The Romance of Crime and The English Way of Death in January 2015, to be followed by at a series of new adventures in 2016 and another in 2017. Lalla Ward also returned as Romana II in Gallifrey: Enemy Lines in 2016, Gallifrey: Time War I in 2018, Gallifrey: Time War II in 2019, Gallifrey: Time War III in 2020, and Gallifrey: Time War IV in 2021. As well as Gallifrey Romana II also featured in a series set while travelling with the Doctor and Adric in E-Space, the Lost Story The Doomsday Contract, and The Eighth of March 2: Protectors of Time.

== Incarnations ==
| Actor | No. of episodes | Original start | | Original end | |
| Actor | No. of episodes | First appearance | Date aired/published | Last appearance | Date aired/published |
|---|---|---|---|---|---|
| Mary Tamm | 26 (6 stories) | The Ribos Operation | 2 September 1978 | The Armageddon Factor (Note: Tamm subsequently reprised the role for Big Finish Productions.) | 24 February 1979 |
| Lalla Ward | 40 (10 stories) | Destiny of the Daleks | 1 September 1979 | Warriors' Gate (Note: Ward subsequently reprised the role multiple times for Big Finish Productions.) | 24 January 1981 |
| —N/a (Note: Based on Louise Brooks, this third incarnation of Romana has no audio or television actor as she only appeared in novels.) | 3 (3 stories) | The Shadows of Avalon | February 2000 | The Gallifrey Chronicles | June 2005 |
| Juliet Landau | 4 (4 stories) | Renaissance | October 2013 | Gallifrey: Intervention Earth (Note: As of December 2023, this 2015 appearance, by the Landau / fourth incarnation of Romana, is the character's most recent appearance.) | January 2015 |

During the opening of Destiny of the Daleks, three momentary incarnations of Romana – in the plot's transition from the Tamm incarnation to the Ward incarnation – were played by uncredited actresses Maggie Armitage, Yvonne Gallagher and Lee Richards.

== List of appearances ==
=== Television ===
Season 16 (Romana I)

- The Ribos Operation
- The Pirate Planet
- The Stones of Blood
- The Androids of Tara
- The Power of Kroll
- The Armageddon Factor

Season 17 (Romana II)

- Destiny of the Daleks
- City of Death
- The Creature from the Pit
- Nightmare of Eden
- The Horns of Nimon
- Shada (not completed or transmitted)

Season 18 (Romana II)

- The Leisure Hive
- Meglos
- Full Circle
- State of Decay
- Warriors' Gate

20th anniversary special

- "The Five Doctors" (footage from Shada) (Romana II)

30th anniversary special

- Dimensions in Time (Romana II)

=== Audio dramas ===
BBV

- K9: The Choice (pseudonymous appearance)
- K9: The Search (pseudonymous appearance)

Big Finish Productions
Romana I

- Gallifrey: Lies
- Gallifrey: Pandora
- Gallifrey: Insurgency
- Gallifrey: Imperiatrix
- Gallifrey: Reborn
- Stealers from Saiph
- Ferril's Folly
- Gallifrey: Reborn
- Tales from the Vault
- The Auntie Matter
- The Sands of Life
- War Against The Lann
- The justice of Jalxar
- Phantoms of the Deep
- The Dalek Contract
- The Final Phase
- Luna Romana

Romana II

- The Apocalypse Element (with the Sixth Doctor)
- Neverland (with the Eighth Doctor)
- Zagreus (with the Eighth Doctor; also holograms based on the Fifth, Sixth and Seventh Doctors)
- Shada (webcast on BBCi, later released on CD)
- Gallifrey: Weapon of Choice
- Gallifrey: Square One
- Gallifrey: The Inquiry
- Gallifrey: A Blind Eye
- Gallifrey: Lies
- Gallifrey: Spirit
- Gallifrey: Pandora
- Gallifrey: Insurgency
- Gallifrey: Imperiatrix
- Gallifrey: Fractures
- Gallifrey: Warfare
- Gallifrey: Appropriation
- Gallifrey: Mindbomb
- Gallifrey: Panacea
- The Beautiful People
- The Chaos Pool (with the Fifth Doctor)
- The Pyralis Effect
- The Invasion of E-Space
- Gallifrey: Reborn
- Gallifrey: Disassembled
- Gallifrey: Annihilation
- Gallifrey: Forever
- Gallifrey: Extermination
- Gallifrey: Renaissance
- Gallifrey: Ascension
- Luna Romana
- Gallifrey: Enemy Lines

Future Romana (a.k.a. Trey)

- Gallifrey: Renaissance
- Gallifrey: Ascension
- Luna Romana
- Gallifrey: Intervention Earth

=== Short Trips audios ===
- Seven to One
- The Old Rogue

=== Novels ===
Virgin Missing Adventures

- Goth Opera by Paul Cornell (Romana II; briefly interacts with the Fifth Doctor)
- The Romance of Crime by Gareth Roberts (Romana II)
- The English Way of Death by Gareth Roberts (Romana II)
- The Shadow of Weng-Chiang by David A. McIntee (Romana I)
- The Well-Mannered War by Gareth Roberts (Romana II)

Virgin New Adventures

- Blood Harvest by Terrance Dicks (Romana II; meets the Seventh Doctor)
- Happy Endings by Paul Cornell (Romana II; meets the Seventh Doctor)
- Lungbarrow by Marc Platt (Romana II; assigns a mission to the Seventh Doctor)

Eighth Doctor Adventures

- The Eight Doctors by Terrance Dicks (Romana II; meets the Eighth Doctor when he visits the Fourth)
- The Shadows of Avalon by Paul Cornell (Romana III; becomes the Eighth Doctor's enemy)
- The Ancestor Cell by Peter Anghelides and Stephen Cole (Romana III; ends with her apparent death)

Past Doctor Adventures

- Tomb of Valdemar by Simon Messingham (Romana I; may also appear in a later incarnation)
- Heart of TARDIS by Dave Stone (Romana I; briefly in the presence of the Second Doctor)
- Festival of Death by Jonathan Morris (Romana II)

=== Short stories ===
- "Glass" by Tara Samms (Short Trips)
- "Return of the Spiders" by Gareth Roberts (More Short Trips)
- "Special Occasions 1: The Not So Sinister Sponge" by Gareth Roberts and Clayton Hickman (Short Trips and Sidesteps)
- "Special Occasions 2: Do You Love Anyone Enough?" by Norman Ashby (Short Trips and Sidesteps)
- "Special Occasions 3: Better Watch Out: Better Take Care" by Steve Burford (Short Trips and Sidesteps)
- "Special Occasions 4: Playing with Toys" by David Agnew (Short Trips and Sidesteps)
- "I Was A Monster!!!" by Joseph Lidster (Short Trips: Zodiac)
- "The Lying Old Witch in the Wardrobe" by Mark Michalowski (Short Trips: Companions)
- "Doing Time" by Lance Parkin (Short Trips: Steel Skies)
- "O, Darkness" by John Binns (Short Trips: Steel Skies)
- "The Time Lord's Story" by Iain McLaughlin and Claire Bartlett (Short Trips: Repercussions)
- "The Little Things" by Paul Beardsley (Short Trips: A Christmas Treasury)
- "The Clanging Chimes of Doom" by Jonathan Morris (Short Trips: A Christmas Treasury)
- "Present Tense" by Ian Potter (Short Trips: A Christmas Treasury)
- "Suitors, Inc." by Paul Magrs (Short Trips: Seven Deadly Sins)
- "Life from Lifelessness" by Keith R.A. DeCandido (Short Trips: Destination Prague)
- "The Glarn Strategy" by Brian Dooley (Short Trips: Snapshots)
- "All Snug in Their Beds" by Scott Alan Woodard (Short Trips: The Ghosts of Christmas)
- "Good Queen, Bad Queen, I Queen, You Queen" by Terri Osborne (Short Trips: The Quality of Leadership)
- "Breadcrumbs" by James Moran (Short Trips: Transmissions)

=== Comics ===
- "Terror on Xaboi" by Paul Crompton (Doctor Who Annual 1980) – 1st incarnation
- "The Weapon" by Paul Crompton (Doctor Who Annual 1980) – 1st incarnation
- "Every Dog Has His Day" by Mel Powell (Doctor Who Annual 1981) – 2nd incarnation
- "Victims" by Dan Abnett, Colin Andrew and Enid Orc (Doctor Who Magazine 212–214) – 2nd incarnation
- "The Seventh Segment" by Gareth Roberts, Paul Peart and Elitta Fell (Doctor Who Magazine Summer Special 1995) – 1st incarnation
