= Cyril Shaps =

English film and television actor (1923–2003)

- Shaps in the Doctor Who serial The Tomb of the Cybermen (1967)
- Born: Cyril Leonard Shaps; 13 October 1923; London, England
- Died: 1 January 2003 (aged 79); Harrow, London, England
- Education: Royal Academy of Dramatic Art
- Occupations: Film, television and radio actor, announcer, producer, scriptwriter
- Years active: 1935–2002
- Known for: The Tomb of the Cybermen; The Spy Who Loved Me; The Madness of King George; The Ambassadors of Death; Lawrence of Arabia; To Sir, with Love; The Importance of Being Earnest; The Androids of Tara
- Spouse: Anita Shaps (m. 1950; died 2002)
- Children: 3

Cyril Leonard Shaps (13 October 1923 – 1 January 2003) was an English character actor of radio, television and film, with a career spanning over seven decades.

== Early radio ==
Shaps was born in the East End of London to Polish-Jewish parents; his father was a tailor. Shaps was a child broadcaster at the London School of Broadcasting, providing voices for radio commercials from the age of 12. He was educated at Central Foundation Boys' School, then took an office job with the London Ambulance Service. Following service as a warrant officer in the Royal Army Educational Corps during World War II, he was trained at the Royal Academy of Dramatic Art (RADA) where he was given the Shakespeare Prizeand then worked for two years as an announcer, producer and scriptwriter for Radio Netherlands. His short stature and round face then led to a steady flow of character roles in film and television in a career spanning nearly 50 years.

== Film ==
Shaps's film appearances included bit parts in Lawrence of Arabia (1962), as the officer's club bartender, To Sir, with Love (1967), as Mr Pinkus, and the James Bond film The Spy Who Loved Me (1977), as Dr Bechmann. In The Madness of King George (1994), he portrayed Dr Pepys, a royal physician obsessed with the colour of the king's stool. In 2002, at the age of 78, Shaps performed his last film roles: as a pew opener in The Importance of Being Earnest, and as concentration camp victim Mr. Grun in The Pianist.

== Television ==
In TV, his work ranged from science fiction (including appearances in the Doctor Who serials The Tomb of the Cybermen, The Ambassadors of Death, Planet of the Spiders and The Androids of Tara), to classic literature (such as the BBC's 1990s serialisations of Charles Dickens's Martin Chuzzlewit and Our Mutual Friend) to detective series (with appearances in The Saint, Lovejoy, and Sherlock Holmes and the Leading Lady—as Emperor Franz Joseph—in 1991). He appeared in the first episode of the sitcom The Young Ones, playing a neighbour. He appeared in two Jim Henson Company television films: Gulliver's Travels (1996) as an elderly madman, and Jack and the Beanstalk: The Real Story (2001) as the "Bent Little Man". He supplied the voice of Professor Rudolf Popkiss in the second series of Supercar, broadcast in 1962. He also voiced the characters of Mr. Gruber in The Adventures of Paddington Bear and Great Grandfather Frost in one episode of Animated Tales of the World.

== Other notable work ==
Other series featuring Shaps were Quatermass II, Danger Man, The Mask of Janus, The Spies, Dixon of Dock Green, Z-Cars, The Saint, Out of the Unknown, Alexander the Greatest, The Rat Catchers, Man in a Suitcase, Randall and Hopkirk, Department S, The Liver Birds, When the Boat Comes In, Some Mothers Do 'Ave 'Em, The Onedin Line, The Persuaders!, Porridge, The Sweeney, Jesus of Nazareth, Wilde Alliance, Holocaust (miniseries), Private Schulz, The Young Ones, Hammer House of Mystery and Suspense, The Bill, Dark Season, Midsomer Murders and Doctors.

Shaps' radio work included a stint with the BBC Drama Repertory Company in the early 1950s. Broadcast parts (his characters often being old men or priests) included Firs in The Cherry Orchard, Justice Shallow in Henry the Fourth, Friar Lawrence in Romeo and Juliet, Polonius in Hamlet and Canon Chasuble in The Importance of Being Earnest, and Sven Olaffson in ' A Life of Bliss'.

== Personal life and death ==
Shaps and his wife Anita Rosen were married from 1950 until her death in 2002; they had two sons, Matthew and Simon, and a daughter, Sarah.

Shaps died in Harrow, London on New Year's Day 2003, aged 79, and was survived by his children.

== Selected filmography ==
- Interpol (1957) – Warden
- Miracle in Soho (1957) – Mr. Swoboda
- The Silent Enemy (1958) – Miguel
- Passport to Shame (1958) – Willie
- Danger Within (1959) – Lt. Cyriakos Coutoules
- SOS Pacific (1959) – Louis
- Never Let Go (1960) – Cypriot
- Follow That Horse! (1960) – Dr. Spiegel
- The Boy Who Stole a Million (1960) – Bank Clerk
- Return of a Stranger (1961) – Homer Trent
- The Terror of the Tongs (1961) – (uncredited)
- The Pursuers (1961) – Karl Luther
- Lawrence of Arabia (1962) – Bartender in Officer's Club (uncredited)
- The Small World of Sammy Lee (1963) – Maurice "Morrie" Bellman
- The Little Ones (1965) – Child Welfare Officer
- Up Jumped a Swagman (1965) – Phil Myers
- Rasputin: the Mad Monk (1966) – Foxy Face (uncredited)
- To Sir, with Love (1967) – Mr. Pinkus (uncredited)
- The Looking Glass War (1970) – East German Detective
- The Kremlin Letter (1970) – Police Doctor
- Our Miss Fred (1972) – Doctor
- QB VII (1974) – Uri Lehrer
- 11 Harrowhouse (1974) – Wildenstein, the Diamond Cutter
- The Odessa File (1974) – Tauber's Voice (voice)
- The Hiding Place (1975) – Building Inspector Smit
- Operation Daybreak (1975) – Father Petrek
- The Message (1976) – (voice)
- The Spy Who Loved Me (1977) – Dr. Bechmann
- Unidentified Flying Oddball (1979) – Dr. Zimmerman
- Avalanche Express (1979) – Sedov
- Erik the Viking (1989) – Gisli the Chiseller
- Sherlock Holmes and the Leading Lady (1991) – Emperor Franz Joseph
- The Madness of King George (1994) – Pepys
- For my Baby (1997) – Joshua Orgelbrand
- The Governess (1998) – Doctor
- Simon Magus (1999) – Chaim
- The Lost Son (1999) – Mr. Spitz
- Solomon and Gaenor (1999) – Ephraim
- The Clandestine Marriage (1999) – Canton
- The End of the Affair (1999) – Waiter
- The Man Who Cried (2000) – Older Man in Sweatshop
- The Pianist (2002) – Mr. Grün
- The Importance of Being Earnest (2002) – Pew Opener (final film role)

== Doctor Who ==
- 1967: The Tomb of the Cybermen – John Viner, episodes 1, 2
- 1970: The Ambassadors of Death – Lennox, episodes 3-5
- 1974: Planet of the Spiders – Professor Clegg, episode 1
- 1978: The Androids of Tara – Archimandrite, episodes 2-4
