= Neville Jason =

English actor

- Born: Neville Abraham Jacobson; 29 May 1934; Marylebone, London, England
- Died: 16 October 2015 (aged 81); Camden, London, England
- Occupations: Actor and director
- Years active: 1958–2015
- Spouse: Gillian Jason
- Children: 2

Neville Jason (29 May 1934 – 16 October 2015) was an English actor.

== Background and career ==
Jason was born Neville Jacobson in London in 1934. His grandfather, Carl, was one of the six original shareholders of Marks & Spencer. In 1943, at age 9, Jason was evacuated from his London home to California as part of the British government's attempts to protect civilians. Here, he discovered a love of acting. When he returned to the United Kingdom, he adopted his stage name of Neville Jason as a tribute to a surname his mother used for her career as a professional singer.

Jason trained in acting at RADA. Early in his career, he was a member of the Royal Shakespeare Company and the Old Vic Theatre Company. In the latter company, he appeared alongside Vivien Leigh and Sir Laurence Olivier in Peter Brook's influential production of Titus Andronicus. Alongside his theatre career, Jason had small roles in notable films including From Russia with Love and The Duellists. On television, he notably appeared as Prince Reynart in the 1978 Doctor Who serial The Androids of Tara and played the regular role of Lapointe on the 1960s television adaptation of Maigret.

=== Audiobooks ===
Jason became most notable for his career as an audiobook narrator and director. He began working with Naxos Audiobooks in 1987 and would go on to record over 60 books for their label. His recordings included the collected works of T. H. White, novels by Thomas Hardy, and an unabridged recording of War and Peace. For his work in audio, Jason won four AudioFile Earphone Awards as a reader and two Talkie Awards as a director. His final recording for Naxos was Primo Levi's The Periodic Table, which he had selected himself.

Jason received international media coverage for his recordings of Marcel Proust's In Search of Lost Time (regarded by Guinness World Records as the longest novel ever written). In the 1990s, he recorded a 36-hour abridgement of the novel, under its traditional title of Remembrance of Things Past. In 2002, he wrote a biography, The Life and Work of Marcel Proust, which he recorded over 3 CDs for Naxos. In 2010, Jason recorded a 10-hour "essential" abridgement of the novel to introduce new readers. In 2011, he was asked by Naxos producer Nicolas Soames to record a complete and unabridged reading of the novel. Jason recorded the 1,260,000 words of the novel, over 45 days. Jason would record approximately 9 hours' worth of material over 3 days, followed by 3 days' rest, and then resuming. Between each volume of the novel, he took a week off. The recordings received enthusiastic reviews, with Michael Mott writing in The Sewanee Review that "Jason creates his own masterpiece for which his training as a singer must be in part responsible".

== Personal life ==
Jason met his wife, Gillian Bosworth, in a production of A Midsummer Night's Dream at the Old Vic Theatre in the 1960s. The couple founded the Gillian Jason Gallery in Camden Town with a focus on contemporary British painters. The couple had two children. They lived in London with a medieval holiday home in France.

== Filmography ==
Year	Title	Role	Notes
1960	Little Ship	Nick	3 episodes
1960–1963	Maigret	Lapointe	26 episodes
1963	From Russia with Love	Chauffeur	
1965	The Amorous Adventures of Moll Flanders	Convict Ship Officer	
1976	The Message	Jaafar	
1977	The Duellists	Hilaire, Wedding Party Guest	
1978	Doctor Who	Prince Reynart	4 episodes: The Androids of Tara
1979	The Passage	Lt. Reinke	
1981	Goodbye Darling	Malcolm Penny	5 episodes
