= The Space Gypsy Adventures =

Space Gypsy website header

The Space Gypsy Adventures is a children's sci-fi comedy radio and internet series created by Cumbrian broadcaster and cartoonist Terry Askew.

== Origins ==
Askew was a radio presenter at West Cumberland Hospital, which included programming entertainment for the children's ward. His original programme was first broadcast on British Hospital Radio in 1986 under the title of The Adventures of Leah, Duke Gemma & Friends, and featured as a cartoon strip in The West Cumberland Times and Star newspaper in 1987. A pilot story was written and recorded for BBC Radio Cumbria in 1987, but was never broadcast owing to budgeting restrictions.

== Plot ==
The series follows the fortunes of two anthropomorphic foxes by the names of Gemma and Damien Mildury as they travel around in their space freighter, The Rapscallion, searching for their parents against the backdrop of an intergalactic war between the Bitlexian Cluster and the Federal Alliance of Planets. The two foxes find asylum on the neutral planet of Zenophon where they are befriended by brother and sister Duke and Leah Rosenly, two anthropomorphic Border Collie dogs who live at the spaceport next to the city of Drakester. From this safe haven, Gemma and Damien set about carving themselves out a living by buying and selling just about anything they can lay their paws on, legitimately or otherwise. The two foxes' dealings inevitably land them on the wrong side of the law, where they invariably end up being chased around by Detective Inspector Spiker, a large black alsatian dog, and Detective Constable Bones, a fox with a Galvert 6 (Welsh) accent.

== Reboot in 2004 ==
The series was resurrected in 2004 under the name of The Space Gypsy Adventures after a break of seventeen years. The programme was wholly narrated by actor John Leeson, who is better known for being the voice behind K-9, the robot dog in the BBC-TV sci-fi series Doctor Who.

The original character designs were conceived by Terry Askew, although the most recent artwork connected to the serial was provided by cartoonist Mark Alexander Smith, creator of the webcomic Transmission. Another member of the creative team is Gerry Paquette, an ex-animator who worked on the 1980s Canadian TV cartoon series The Raccoons.

In September 2015 John Leeson retired from the programme. In January 2016 the show was withdrawn from the Hospital radio circuit. The complete Space Gypsy series is available to download from the Official Space Gypsy Adventures Facebook site.

== Episodes ==
All stories wholly written by Terry Askew, except "The Christmas New Arrival", which was written in collaboration with Gerry Paquette. All stories feature minor edits and suggestions by John Leeson. "Engagement Rings and Sneezing Powder" was based on ideas submitted by teenagers Julie Williams and Paul Thomlinson, who won a best storyline contest at Askew's former school, Netherhall, in Maryport.

=== 1986-1987 ===
- "Duke & The Space Gypsy" (1986)
- "Preparing a Surprise For Gemma" (1986)
- "Gemma's Birthday Party" (1986)
- "Leah's Tragical Mystery Tour" (1986)
- "The Day Trip To Tower Head" (1986)
- "Leah's Wedding" (1986)
- "The Greatest Adventures of Leah, Duke, Gemma & Friends" (Compilation clip show) (1986)
- "The New Arrival" (1987)
- "Teething Troubles" (1987)
- "Gemma's Dilemma" (1987)
- "Engagement Rings And Sneezing Powder" (1987)
- "The Great Chocolate Biscuit Caper" (1987)
- "Leah's Christmas Pantomime" (1987)
- "Duke & The Space Gypsy" (1987) (5 part BBC Radio Cumbria remake of the 1986 story, not broadcast until 2006)

=== 2004-2014 ===
- "The Great Chocolate Biscuit Caper" (2004) (Remake)
- "The Daytrip to Tower City" (2005) (Remake of the 1986 story "The Day Trip To Tower Head")
- "The Christmas New Arrival" (2007) (Remake of the 1987 story "The New Arrival")
- "Damien & The Snow Kitten" (2009)
- "Damien's Valentine's Day Panic" (2010)
- "Pilfered Puddings and Pantomimes" aka "Gemderella" (2011) (Remake of the 1987 story "Leah's Christmas Pantomime")
- "The St. Valentine's Day Mix-up" (2014)

== Fluff Catt and The Rock Kittens ==
One of the main characters in the show, Fluff Catt, a close friend of Gemma's, ventured into a musical career under the guise of Fluff Catt and the Rock Kittens. The band was made up of Fluff and a few other members of the Space Gypsy cast. In reality the band consisted of a bunch of session musicians, with the main vocals being provided by Mandi Leonard, lead vocalist of the UK cabaret band The Seductions. Fluff Catt's debut album When Will You Be Mine? was released in October 2013. The album was co-produced by UK record producer Alan Hawkshaw.

=== Discography ===
==== Albums ====
- When Will You Be Mine? (2013)
- Grrreatest Hits (2017)

==== Singles ====
- "When Will You Be Mine?/You Can't" (2013)
- "Somewhere In My Heart" (2014)
- "Just One More Step" (2015)
- "When Will You Be Mine (2015 remix)" (2015)
