= Declan Mulholland =

Northern Irish character actor (1932–1999)

- Mulholland c. 1970s
- Born: Thomas Declan Mulholland; 6 December 1932; Belfast, Northern Ireland
- Died: 29 June 1999 (aged 66); London, England
- Occupation: Actor
- Years active: 1962–1997

Thomas Declan Mulholland (6 December 1932 – 29 June 1999) was a Northern Irish character actor of film and television. He is known for his multiple appearances in Doctor Who and for his deleted portrayal of Jabba the Hutt in Star Wars.

== Career ==
Born in Belfast, he had his first film role in H.M.S. Defiant (1962) as Morrison. He had a substantial part in the 1974 Amicus Productions film The Land That Time Forgot. He played Jabba the Hutt on-set in a deleted scene of the original Star Wars (1977), which was intended to be replaced by a stop-motion character. The scene was reinserted for the film's twentieth anniversary re-release in 1997, with Mulholland replaced by a CGI Jabba as he appears in Return of the Jedi.

His many TV appearances included The Avengers (1967) episode The Fear Merchants (in the background of the gym scene), Doctor Who stories The Sea Devils (1972) and The Androids of Tara (1978), The Bill, The Onedin Line and Quatermass.

Mulholland died of a heart attack on 29 June 1999, aged 66.

== Filmography ==
=== Film ===
Year	Title	Role	Notes
1962	H.M.S. Defiant	Morrison	
1963	Mystery Submarine	Duty chief	
1968	30 Is a Dangerous Age, Cynthia	Storyteller's aide	Uncredited
1968	The Charge of the Light Brigade	Farrier	
1968	Great Catherine	Count Tokhtamysh	
1969	Guns in the Heather	Retchick	
1971	Naughty!	Policeman	
1972	The Ruling Class	Poacher	
1973	Theater of Blood	Meths drinker	
1974	On the Game	2nd Jailer	
1974	The Land That Time Forgot	Olson	
1975	Brannigan	Neighbour	Uncredited
1977	Joseph Andrews	Resurrectionist	
1977	Double Exposure	Kidnapper Joe	
1980	High Rise Donkey	Crook	
1980	Hawk the Slayer	Sped	The hunchback leader of the slavers.
1981	Time Bandits	3rd Robber	
1989	The Tall Guy	Rubberface Doorman	
1990	The Rainbow Thief	Pug	
1993	The Princess and the Cobbler	Brigand	Voice
1994	War of the Buttons	Priest	
1995	The Run of the Country	Farmer	
1997	The Pig's Family	Tim	Short (final film role)

=== Television ===
Year	Title	Role	Notes
1963	As You Like It	Second Lord	TV movie
1964	Espionage	The Lout	1 episode
1966	The Three Musketeers	Harbour Master	1 episode
1966–1976	Dixon of Dock Green	Connolly/Padraic Browne/Bert Kelly	3 episodes
1967–1971	Z-Cars	Mike Murphy/Jack/Flanagan	3 episodes
1967	The Avengers	Saunders	1 episode
1967	The Revenue Men	Barney McQuarry	1 episode
1968	Dr. Finlay's Casebook	Taffy Jones	1 episode
1969	The Borderers	Blackett	1 episode
1971–1972	Armchair Theatre	Prisoner Officer/Protestant Man	2 episodes
1972	Doctor Who	Clark	2 episodes; serial The Sea Devils
1974	The Prince of Denmark	Danny	3 episodes
1975	Churchill's People	Augustus Hicky	Episode: Mother India
1976	Angels	1st Man	1 episode
1976	Rogue Male	Cook	TV movie
1978	Doctor Who	Till	3 episodes; serial The Androids of Tara
1978	The Losers	Ex-Wrestler	3 episodes
1979	Bloomers	Mr O'Shaughnessy	1 episode (episode five)
1979	Quatermass	Security Guard	2 episodes
1980	Oppenheimer	F.B.I. Agent	1 episode
1984	Much Ado About Nothing	Member of Watch	TV movie
1987–1995	Casualty	Mac / O'Grady	2 episodes
1989–1990	The Bill	Raymond Kellow	2 episodes
1991	The Brittas Empire	Boilerman Barnes	Episode: Opening Day
1993	Lovejoy	Council Workman	Episode: Who is the Fairest of Them All?
1996	Father Ted	Shouting Priest	Episode: New Jack City
