= The Androids of Tara =

101 – The Androids of Tara
- Doctor Who serial

Cast
- Doctor: Tom Baker – Fourth Doctor
- Companions: Mary Tamm – Romana; John Leeson (Voice of K9)
- Others: Neville Jason – Prince Reynart; Peter Jeffrey – Count Grendel; Simon Lack – Zadek; Paul Lavers – Farrah; Lois Baxter – Lamia; Martin Matthews – Kurster; Declan Mulholland – Till; Cyril Shaps – Archimandrite

Production
- Directed by: Michael Hayes
- Written by: David Fisher
- Script editor: Anthony Read
- Produced by: Graham Williams
- Executive producer: None
- Music by: Dudley Simpson
- Production code: 5D
- Series: Season 16
- Running time: 4 episodes, 25 minutes each
- First broadcast: 25 November – 16 December 1978

Chronology
← Preceded by The Stones of Blood	Followed by → The Power of Kroll

The Androids of Tara is the fourth serial of the 16th season of the British science fiction television series Doctor Who, which was first broadcast in four weekly parts on BBC1 from 25 November to 16 December 1978.

In the serial, the alien time traveller the Fourth Doctor (Tom Baker) and his assistant Romana (Mary Tamm) land on the planet Tara in search of the fourth segment of the powerful Key to Time. Tara is a sparsely populated feudal society of humans, but with the technology to make electronic weapons and androids. The evil Count Grendel of Gracht (Peter Jeffrey) kidnaps Romana and the rightful heir to the throne of Tara, Prince Reynart (Neville Jason), as part of his plot to become the legitimate King of Tara.

== Plot ==
The Fourth Doctor and Romana arrive on the planet Tara in search of the fourth segment of the Key to Time. While the Doctor goes fishing, Romana finds the fourth segment, disguised as part of an old statue. After retrieving it, she is attacked by a native Taran bear and saved by Count Grendel, who takes Romana to his castle on the pretext of treating her injured ankle. Once there, it becomes clear that Grendel believes she is an android, because she exactly resembles the captive Princess Strella. When Grendel finds Romana is instead flesh-and-blood organic, she is imprisoned in Grendel's dungeon.

The noble swordsmen Zadek and Farrah recruit the Doctor to assist Prince Reynart, who must reach the throne room of the castle in time to be crowned king or forfeit his crown to Grendel. The Doctor agrees to help repair an android copy of the Prince to be used as a decoy to distract Grendel's men. Grendel strikes first, drugging the Prince and his retinue and kidnapping Reynart. When the Doctor and the swordsmen recover, they decide to crown the android Reynart instead. The Doctor and his party sneak the android Prince into the throne room, and the Prince is crowned King, despite an attempt by Grendel to prevent this by using an android copy of Princess Stella which the Doctor stops.

Till, Grendel's manservant, arrives at the Reynart estate and offers the Doctor a chance to collect Romana. It turns out to be a trap; the real Romana has been replaced by an android. K9 detects the android Romana and eliminates it. Meanwhile, the real Romana escapes from Castle Gracht and helps the Doctor flee. Grendel comes to Reynart's estate under a flag of truce, to secretly offer the crown to the Doctor, but then destroys the Reynart android and recaptures Romana. As the real Princess Strella is also imprisoned in Grendel's castle but is unwilling to assist in Grendel's diabolical scheme, the evil Count now plots to have Romana pose as Strella and marry the real King Reynart. Once they are married and she is his Queen, Reynart will be killed, leaving Grendel free to marry her and become King of Tara.

The Doctor has K9 assist him to gain access to the castle by means of the moat and tunnels. The Doctor reaches the throne room just in time to stop Reynart's coerced marriage to Romana. He then engages the Count in a deadly duel with electro-swords, eventually defeating him and forcing him to flee. Romana has meanwhile freed Strella who is finally reunited with Reynart. Having retrieved the fourth segment of the Key to Time, the Doctor, Romana and K9 depart.

== Production ==
The story was loosely based on the novel The Prisoner of Zenda, having been commissioned under the working title "The Androids of Zenda." While overt references to the novel were dropped from the story during production, the novel's basic plot remained.

Mary Tamm designed Romana's distinctive purple outfit after the originally planned costume proved unsuitable. Although Tamm was a skilled horse-rider, she refused to do the horse-riding sequence herself because she could not wear a helmet and felt that the potential of an accident was too great. Location work was performed at Leeds Castle, Kent.

In the opening credits, the episode number appears before the writer's name, contrary to the order in most Doctor Who stories.

=== Cast notes ===
Mary Tamm plays four roles in this story: Romana, Princess Strella and their android doubles.

Peter Jeffrey previously played the colony pilot in The Macra Terror (1967). Declan Mulholland previously played Clark in The Sea Devils (1972). This is Cyril Shaps's fourth and final appearance in Doctor Who, the others being The Tomb of the Cybermen (1967), The Ambassadors of Death (1970) and Planet of the Spiders (1974). It is his only appearance in which his character is not killed. Simon Lack had previously appeared as Professor Kettering in The Mind of Evil (1971).

== Broadcast and reception ==
Episode	Title	Run time	Original release date	UK viewers (millions)
1	"Part One"	24:53	25 November 1978	8.5
2	"Part Two"	24:27	2 December 1978	10.1
3	"Part Three"	23:52	9 December 1978	8.9
4	"Part Four"	24:49	16 December 1978	9.0

The story was repeated on four consecutive Thursdays on BBC1 from 9–30 August 1979, achieving viewing figures of 6.2, 10.4, 10.4 and 9.6 million, respectively. The rise in figures is attributable to the ITV strike, which started on 10th August and would continue well into the upcoming seventeenth season of Doctor Who.

In their book The Discontinuity Guide (1995), Paul Cornell, Martin Day and Keith Topping described The Androids of Tara as "Wonderful, Doctor Who as heroic romance, with plenty of swashbuckling, wit and colour." They particularly praised the Doctor's duel at the end and the small stakes. On the other hand, David J. Howe and Stephen James Walker in The Television Companion (1998) felt that the story relied on The Prisoner of Zenda, which made it "rather less engaging than the other stories of the season, coming over more as a gentle run-around than as anything particularly significant". They praised the premise, but wrote that there was a lack of suspense and the characters were bland, with the exception of Grendel. DVD Talk's Justin Felix agreed, writing that "its whimsical nature makes this episode feel more like an excursion than an advancement of the season's storyline" and described the story as "a competent albeit standard runaround". However, he praised Baker and the development of Romana's character. Felix gave the story three out of five stars. In 2011, Patrick Mulkern of Radio Times praised the acting and direction, but stated that it "strays too far into the 'adventure serial' territory" and lacked a sense of "real urgency or jeopardy".

In an interview in autumn 2009, Mary Tamm considered this to be her favourite Doctor Who story as she liked the setting of Leeds Castle [in Kent], her costume, her fellow actors, and that she could play "three" parts - Romana, an android, and Princess Strella.

== Commercial releases ==
Doctor Who and the Androids of Tara
- Author: Terrance Dicks
- Cover artist: Andrew Skilleter
- Series: Doctor Who book: Target novelisations
- Release number: 3
- Publisher: Target Books
- Publication date: 24 April 1980
- ISBN: 0-426-20108-6

=== In print ===
A novelisation of this serial, written by Terrance Dicks, was published by Target Books in April 1980. An audiobook release of this story was made in 2012, and does not use the Target novelisation by Terrance Dicks, but uses a brand-new novelisation written for audio by David Fisher and narrated by John Leeson. This David Fisher novelisation was released in paperback 14 July 2022 as part of the Target Collection. An audiobook of the original Dicks novelisation will be released 5 November 2026 The Fisher novelisation will be included in The Key to Time collection 29 October 2026.

=== Home media ===
The Androids of Tara was released on VHS on 1 May 1995. This serial, along with the rest of season sixteen, was released in North America as part of the Key to Time box set. A remastered version was released on region 2 DVD in September 2007, and region 1 in March 2009.
