= Zanak =

Zanak is an Indian surname. Notable people with the surname include:

- Subhash Zanak (1955–2013), Indian politician
- Amit Subhashrao Zanak, Indian politician
