= Susan Engel =

Austrian-born British actress (born 1935)

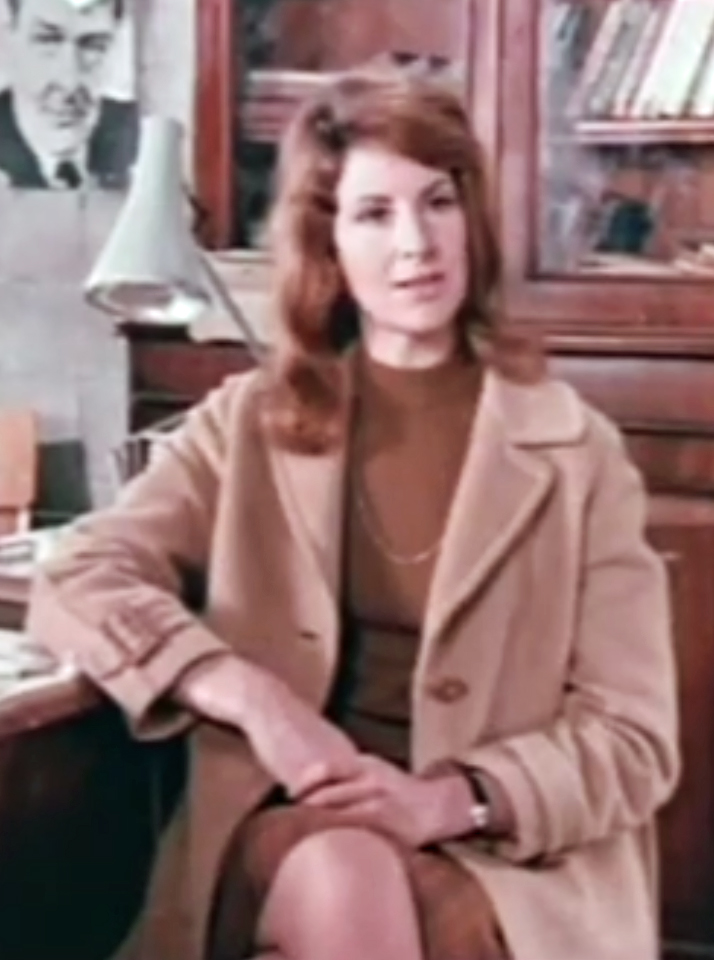
- Engel in trailer for "Butley" (1974)
- Born: 25 March 1935 (age 91); Vienna, Federal State of Austria. (present-day, Austria)
- Occupation: Actress
- Years active: 1959–present
- Spouse: Sylvester Morand (m. 1968)

Susan Engel (born 25 March 1935) is an Austrian-born British actress.

== Early life and education ==
Susan Engel was born on 25 March 1935 in Vienna, to Fritz Engel and Anni Engel (née Stefansky). Engel was educated at the University of Paris and Bristol University.

Engel received theatre training at the Bristol Old Vic Theatre School.

== Career ==
=== Theatre ===
Engel's work in theatre includes: Angels in America (1992), Richard III, King Lear (1990), The Good Person of Sezuan, Watch on the Rhine (1980), Spring Awakening, The Hour We Knew Nothing of Each Other and Her Naked Skin (2008) at the National Theatre, London; Women Beware Women (2006), Luminosity (2001), Bad Weather, The Dybbuk, King John (1988), Cousin Vladimir (1978), The Tempest, The Comedy of Errors (1962), Julius Caesar (1963), Henry VI, Part 2 and The Wars of The Roses (1963) for the RSC; Spinning into Butter, The Happy Haven, Hotel in Amsterdam (1968) and Macbeth at the Royal Court, London, Hecuba (2004) at the Donmar Warehouse, London; After The Gods, Ascent of Mt Fuji and Shortlist at the Hampstead Theatre, London; The Sea at the Chichester Festival Theatre, Chichester; Prayers of Serkin at the Old Vic, London, A Passage to India (2003) for Shared Experience; Himself at the Nuffield Theatre, Southampton; Brand (2003), An Inspector Calls, The Clandestine Marriage (for which she won the Clarence Derwent Award for Best Supporting Actress), Footfalls (1994), The Cherry Orchard, A Kind of Alaska (1985), Hamlet, The Last of the Red Hot Lovers and Three Sisters in the West End, London.

=== Television ===
Her work in television includes the series The Lotus Eaters (1973) and the Doctor Who serial The Stones of Blood (1978). In 2004 she appeared in the popular detective series Midsomer Murders "Sins of Commission" as Camilla Crofton and in 2011 "Death in the Slow Lane" as Harriet Wingate. Other TV credits include: afterlife, The Black Death, Quiet as a Nun, Dalziel and Pascoe, Trial and Retribution V, Thursday the 12th, The Vice, Kavanagh QC, Public Eye, Underworld, Inspector Morse, Crown Court, The Cedar Tree and Holby City.

=== Radio ===
In 2004, she guest-starred in the audio drama Gallifrey: A Blind Eye, produced by Big Finish Productions. Other radio includes: Looking for Angels: Left at the Angel, The January Wedding, The Making of the English Landscape, The Great Pursuit, The Bruno Bettelheim Project, The Raj Quartet, Miss Esther's Guest, Are You Sure?, Peeling Figs for Julius, La Grande Therese, Anne of Green Gables and Black Narcissus.

=== Film ===
Film credits include: The Leading Man (1996), Damage (1992), Ascendancy (1983), Hopscotch (1980), Butley (1974), King Lear (1971), Inspector Clouseau (1968) and Charlie Bubbles (1967).

== Personal life ==
In January 1968, Engel married fellow actor Sylvester Morand.
