= John Leeson =

English actor (1943–2026)

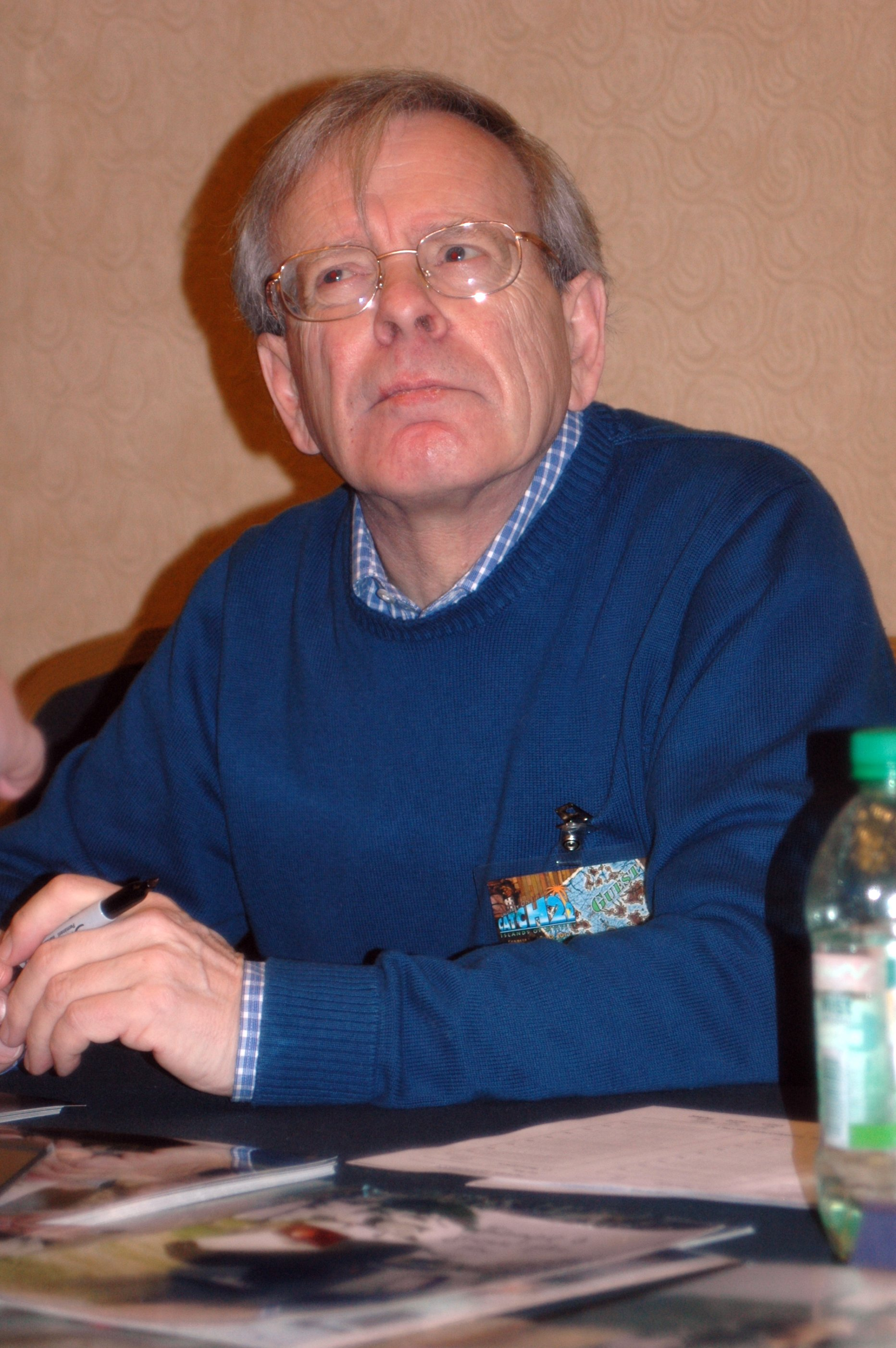
- Leeson in 2011
- Born: John Francis Christopher Ducker; 16 March 1943; Stoneygate, Leicester, England
- Died: 1 November 2026 (aged 83)
- Education: Royal Academy of Dramatic Art
- Occupation: Actor
- Years active: 1964–2026
- Known for: K9 in Doctor Who; Bungle in Rainbow
- Political party: Liberal Democrats
- Spouse: Judy Griffiths (m. 1969)
- Children: 1

John Francis Christopher Ducker (16 March 1943 – 1 November 2026), known professionally as John Leeson, was an English actor. He was known for portraying Bungle in Rainbow (1972) and voicing K9 in Doctor Who (1977–2008) and spin-offs The Sarah Jane Adventures (2007–2010) and K9 (2009–2010). Leeson trained at the Royal Academy of Dramatic Art and had several theatre and television roles before his work in Doctor Who. Initially planned for one serial, K9 appeared in several seasons of Doctor Who's original run before returning in 2006, which led to further appearances in other media.

== Early life ==
John Francis Christopher Ducker was born at St Francis Hospital in Stoneygate, Leicester, England, on 16 March 1943, the third child of Barbara Mary Gilbert (née Payne) and Eric Neilson Ducker. His older siblings were Alison and Peter. His father was the vicar of St Margaret's Church in Leicester (later canon of Leicester Cathedral), himself the son of a vicar from Derbyshire. Ducker's maternal grandfather, Canon Payne, worked with the Red Cross during the First World War and received an OBE.

Ducker attended the Pilgrims' School on a choral scholarship before moving to Bryanston School. His first job was as a hospital porter at the Leicester Royal Infirmary, at which his father was a hospital chaplain. His childhood acting experiences included at Leicester's Little Theatre and productions at the St Margaret's Drama Society (of which his mother was president).

Ducker successfully auditioned for the Royal Academy of Dramatic Art (RADA), which he attended from 1962 to 1964. He adopted a stage name, John Leeson, based on his godmother's surname. Leeson attended RADA with Terry Hands and Susan Fleetwood, and during his time travelled to the United States to perform plays by William Shakespeare.

== Career ==
His first role was repertory theatre at Frinton-on-Sea, directed by one of his RADA tutors, Michael Ashton. He later worked in Colchester, Birmingham, Newcastle, and at Nottingham Playhouse, predominantly playing character roles like old men; he enjoyed wearing makeup and disguises.

Kenneth Waller introduced Leeson to some London production companies; his first London stage show was held by Moral Re-Armament at Westminster Theatre, while his introduction to West End theatre was Plaza Suite at the Lyric Theatre in 1969. He was soon introduced to television acting as a French hippie in Crossroads (1967–1968). Leeson became a regular television performer, including in the Dad's Army episode "Sons of the Sea" (1969), 50 episodes of Rainbow (1972), and Sorry! (1981). In Rainbow, he played a bear named Bungle, which required him to wear a large bear suit. He continued theatre work, including in Don't Start Without Me at the Garrick Theatre in 1971.

Leeson appeared in two episodes of Blake's 7: "Mission to Destiny" (1978) and "Gambit" (1979). Other credits include appearances Jigsaw in which he voiced Jigg, the show's "mascot". He was one of the resident team of actors in stunts for ITV's Game for a Laugh (1981–1985), and he portrayed several different characters in Beadle's About (1986–1987, 1992).

His film credits included the Hunt Secretary in the film of Tarka the Otter (1979) and a professor in Miami Connection (1985). Leeson worked as a continuity announcer for several networks, including BFBS Television, the BBC, and Channel 4, and he read extensively for the Calibre Audio Library. He narrated and provided voices for The Space Gypsy Adventures on Children's UK hospital radio. In 2026, Leeson reunited with Tom Baker in the Kickstarter-funded audio drama series Sir Sherlock, playing Dr. Watson to Baker's Sherlock Holmes.

=== Doctor Who and spin-offs ===
One of Leeson's friends, director Derrick Goodwin, cast him as the voice of K9 in the Doctor Who serial The Invisible Enemy (1977) after a chance encounter at the Duke of Kent pub. Producer Graham Williams encouraged him to audition for the role, seeking a more humorous tone for the programme. Williams and script editor Robert Holmes liked the character so much that the decision was made to retain him as a regular character to appeal to the younger members of the audience; it was later considered Leeson's breakthrough role. The character initially had little involvement in serials due to his last-minute addition, but became more involved in The Sun Makers (1977) and Underworld (1978). K9 could not appear in The Power of Kroll (1978–1979) due to the filming location; Leeson, who was under contract, appeared in person as the technician Dugeen. Tom Baker, who played the Fourth Doctor, detested the character of K9, but had a good friendship with Leeson.

Leeson became worried about how appearing only as the voice of the character would hinder future employment if he was not appearing in visible roles; he departed in The Armageddon Factor (1979), at the end of the sixteenth season, replaced by David Brierley. After Brierley's departure, Leeson returned for the eighteenth season (1980–1981) at the request of producer John Nathan-Turner, as the character was being written out of the series; Nathan-Turner felt Brierley "lacked the sparkle" of Leeson's performance. He voiced the character in K-9 and Company (1981), a failed television pilot starring Elisabeth Sladen as Sarah Jane Smith. He later had cameo appearances in "The Five Doctors" (1983) and Dimensions in Time (1993).

Leeson's vocal contributions to Doctor Who can also be heard as other characters in the serials The Invisible Enemy and Remembrance of the Daleks. He voiced the character for several appearances outside of Doctor Who, including Blue Peter (1977), The Generation Game (1981), The Weakest Link (2007), Celebrity Eggheads (2010), and Pointless Celebrities (2013). Leeson portrayed Anthony in the Doctor Who spin-off film Downtime (1995) and returned as K9 in Audio Adventures in Time and Space before appearing in several audio dramas by Big Finish Productions.

He returned to Doctor Who in the 2006 episode "School Reunion" alongside Sladen, which led to frequent appearances in the spinoff series The Sarah Jane Adventures (2007–2011). Around the same time, he appeared in another spinoff series, K9 (2009–2010); Leeson found the series "strange", feeling that K9 works best as a side character instead of the leading role. In November 2013, Leeson appeared as K9 in the one-off 50th anniversary comedy homage The Five(ish) Doctors Reboot. K9's producers were set to create a feature film, Timequake, for the character's fortieth anniversary in 2017, starring Leeson.

=== Other activities ===
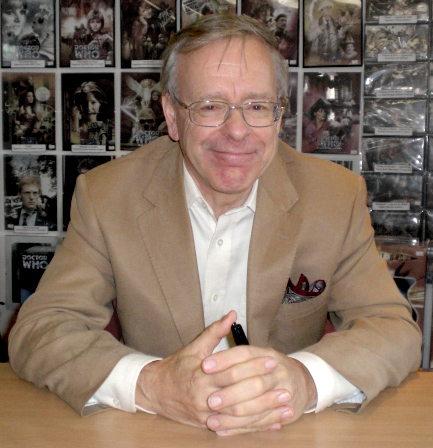
Leeson at The Television & Movie Store in September 2008

Under his birth name, he was an accredited tutor for the Wine & Spirit Education Trust, and he was a member both of the Association of Wine Educators and the Circle of Wine Writers. He was a freelance lecturer in wine both on land and in cruises at sea, and was a regular tutor for The Wine Education Service Ltd. He contributed a chapter on teaching wine tasting (in his birth name of John Ducker) to Educated Tastes: Food, Drink and Connoisseur Culture, edited by Jeremy Strong.

Leeson's autobiography, entitled Flight of the Budgerigar, was published by Hirst in October 2011. It was superseded by an updated and expanded version entitled Tweaking the Tail which was published in July 2013 by Fantom Films. A book of favourite recipes collected across the years, Dog's Dinners, also published by Fantom, was published in May 2014.

=== Public service ===
Leeson served as a local justice of the peace for over 25 years. In 2002 and 2010, under his birth name of John Ducker, he stood as a candidate for the Liberal Democrats in the district of Perivale in the local council elections for Ealing London Borough Council, but failed to be elected.

== Personal life ==
Leeson married Judy Griffiths in Kensington on 2 August 1969. Judy worked as an assistant at the BBC, including on Blue Peter. Leeson was acting as a bridegroom in Private Suite at the time of his wedding; he performed the show twice in the same evening hours after his wedding. Their son, Guy Ducker (born 1972), is a film editor and director. Leeson's father died of cancer in December 1976, and his mother died in March 1981. He was especially close to his father, who he praised for his humour and patience, and he credited his mother for "passing her artistic genes" despite having a more difficult emotional relationship. Leeson was diagnosed with kidney cancer in 2007, which was discovered while preparing for heart valve surgery; his kidney was removed, and the heart surgery took place the following year.

=== Death ===
Leeson died on 1 November 2026, aged 83, after a period of illness. His death was announced by his son, Guy, who included a Shakespeare quote and thanked "the Whovian community for the love they showed to my father over the decades".

Former Doctor Who showrunner Russell T Davies paid tribute to Leeson, praising his voice as K9: "pitched perfectly so that kids could impersonate him. That's not easy, that's hell of a piece of acting". Other tributes came from Keith Barnfather, who worked with Leeson from the 1980s and praised his professionalism and kindness, and Lisa Bowerman, who remembered him as "an utterly lovely man, excellent company and – and I don't hesitate to use this word for once – a truly iconic voice".

== Filmography ==
=== Television ===
Year	Title	Role	Notes	Ref.
1967–1968	Crossroads	Henri de Burgoyne	6 episodes	
1969	Dad's Army	1st soldier	Episode: "Sons of the Sea"	
1972	Rainbow	Bungle	50 episodes	
1977–1981; 1983; 1993; 2006; 2008	Doctor Who	K9 (voice)	Seasons 15, 16, 18 "The Five Doctors"; Dimensions in Time "School Reunion" "Journey's End"	
1977	Doctor Who	Nucleus (voice)	Serial: The Invisible Enemy	
1977	Doctor Who	Computer (voice)	Serial: The Sun Makers (uncredited)	
1977	Crown Court	Rev Claude Pacey-Dunstan	Episode: "An Upward Fall" (Part 1)	
1977	Blue Peter	K9 (voice)	1 episode	
1978; 1981; 2001	The Generation Game	K9 / Bungle (voice)	3 episodes	
1978	Blake's 7	Pasco	Episode: "Mission to Destiny"	
1979	Blake's 7	Toise	Episode: "Gambit"	
1979	Doctor Who	Dugeen	Serial: The Power of Kroll	
1979	Jigsaw	Jigg / Biggum		
1981	Sorry!	Victor	3 episodes	
1981	K-9 and Company	K9 (voice)	TV movie	
1982	The Barretts of Wimpole Street	Henry Barrett	TV movie	
1985	The Great Egg Race	Freddie	Episode: "Dastardly Deeds at Eggraze Hall"	
1986–1987; 1992	Beadle's About	Guard / Councillor / Attendant / Officer; Vicar	8 episodes	
1987	Whoops Apocalypse	TV interviewer	1 episode	
1988	Doctor Who	Dalek Battle Computer (voice)	Serial: Remembrance of the Daleks	
1989	'Allo 'Allo!	Train's Cook	Episode: "All Aboard"	
1989	Shadow of the Noose	Dickinson	Episode: "Noblesse Oblige"	
1993	The Bill	Mr Witchell	Episode: "Out of the Mouths"	
1994	Minder	Passport Officer	Episode: "Another Case of Van Blank"	
1995	Bugs	Harris	Episode: "Manna from Heaven"	
1998	Vanity Fair	Priest	TV mini-series, Episode #1.3	
2000	Longitude	BBC Producer	Episode: "Episode 2"	
2001	Doctors	Alan Carmichael	Episode: "A Parent's Right to Choose"	
2007	ChuckleVision	Viscount	Episode: "Big Break"	
2007–2010	The Sarah Jane Adventures	K9 (voice)	12 episodes	
2009–2010	K9	K9 (voice)	26 episodes	
2010	Celebrity Eggheads	Himself	Series 3, episode 6	

=== Film ===
Year	Title	Role	Ref.
1979	Tarka the Otter	Secretary of Hunt	
1988	Miami Connection	Computer Science Professor	

== Bibliography ==
- Leeson, John (1 October 2011). The Flight of the Budgerigar: The Autobiography of John Leeson. Hirst Publishing. ISBN 978-1907959318.
- Leeson, John (15 July 2013). Tweaking The Tail: The Autobiography of John Leeson. Fantom Films Limited. ISBN 978-1781960851.
- Leeson, John (17 May 2014). Dog's Dinners. FantomFilms Limited. ISBN 978-1781961063.
- Ducker, John (2011). "Teaching Wine-tasting". In Strong, Jeremy (ed.). Educated Tastes: Food, Drink, and Connoisseur Culture. University of Nebraska Press. doi:10.2307/j.ctt1df4fx7.8. ISBN 978-0-8032-1935-9.
