= Mary Tamm =

English actress (1950–2012)

- Tamm as Romana I in Doctor Who
- Born: 22 March 1950; Bradford, West Riding of Yorkshire, England
- Died: 26 July 2012 (aged 62); London, England
- Education: Royal Academy of Dramatic Art
- Occupation: Actress
- Years active: 1970–2012
- Spouse: Marcus Ringrose (m. 1978)
- Children: 1

Mary Tamm (22 March 1950 – 26 July 2012) was an English actress who appeared in many British TV drama series and serials. She is best known for her role as Romana I in the BBC's science fiction television series Doctor Who, appearing opposite Tom Baker in the 1978–1979 story arc The Key to Time.

== Early life ==
Tamm was born in Bradford, West Riding of Yorkshire, to an Estonian father and a half-Russian mother, who was an opera singer. Her parents had fled Estonia after four of her father's brothers had died in Stalin's gulag labour camps. Tamm spoke only Estonian at home, and attended Estonian-language school on Saturdays. She did not begin learning English until she was enrolled in primary school. At age 11, she won a scholarship to attend Bradford Girls' Grammar School and joined the city's Civic Theatre. She was a graduate and an associate member of the Royal Academy of Dramatic Art, where she studied from 1969 to 1971.

== Acting career ==
Tamm began acting on the stage with the Birmingham Repertory Company in 1971. She moved to London in 1972 and appeared in the musical Mother Earth. Her first TV role for the BBC was as Sally in The Donati Conspiracy shown in 1973. This was followed by an episode of Warship in 1974. In 1975, she featured in Muriel Spark's The Girls of Slender Means on BBC2. Before her association with Doctor Who, Tamm acted in a few films, including Tales That Witness Madness (1973), The Odessa File (1974) and The Likely Lads (1976).

Tamm is best known for her role as Romana I in the BBC's science fiction television series Doctor Who, appearing opposite Tom Baker in the 1978–1979 story arc The Key to Time. She was not initially interested in playing a companion to the Doctor, believing that the role was merely that of the "damsel in distress", but she changed her mind when assured by the producers that Romana would be a member of the Doctor's own race and therefore as capable as he. Tamm left the programme after only one season because she felt that the character had reverted to the traditional assistant role and could not be developed further. In a 2007 interview, she stated that she was willing to shoot a regeneration sequence to allow a smooth transition between her tenure and that of her eventual successor (Lalla Ward), but was not invited to do so. One source states that pregnancy was the reason that she was not asked to return, which Tamm denied as a false rumour invented by producer John Nathan-Turner. In an interview given in autumn 2009, Mary Tamm considered The Androids of Tara to be her favourite Doctor Who story as she liked the setting of Leeds Castle [in Kent], her costume, her fellow actors, and that she could play three parts - Romana, the android, and Princess Strella.

After leaving the series, Tamm took leading roles in two BBC 1 dramas, The Treachery Game (1980) and its sequel The Assassination Run (1981) alongside Malcolm Stoddard. In 1981, she took the part of Rhoda Dawes in Agatha Christie's Cards on the Table at London's Vaudeville Theatre. She subsequently appeared in Barry Letts' production of Jane Eyre on BBC1 in 1983, opposite Timothy Dalton. She had a leading role in the sitcom The Hello, Goodbye Man opposite Ian Lavender in 1984 for BBC 2, around the same time as a guest appearance in Bergerac. In the early 1990s she was a regular guest panellist on the ITV morning quiz show Crosswits.

Subsequently, Tamm played the characters of Penny Crosbie in the soap opera Brookside from 1993 to 1996, and Yvonne Edwards in the BBC drama Paradise Heights (2002), as well as guest roles in many other television programmes, including Crime Traveller on BBC1, another time travel drama. Tamm returned as Pandora in the second series of the Gallifrey audio plays produced by Big Finish Productions. Her first such appearance was in Gallifrey: Lies (2005). She also appeared (as herself) in a special feature in the 2007 DVD boxed set release of The Key to Time, discussing her experiences on the programme. In August 2009, Tamm made a brief one-week appearance as Orlenda in EastEnders. Reprising the role of Romana, Tamm recorded seven new Doctor Who audio adventures for Big Finish Productions with Tom Baker shortly before her death, which were released in 2013 as series 2 of the Fourth Doctor Adventures.

== Personal life and death ==
Tamm was married to Marcus Ringrose, an insurance executive, from 1978 until her death from cancer on 26 July 2012. They had one daughter, Lauren, born November 1979.

Tamm had been diagnosed with cancer in 2010 (or early 2011 - "18 months" prior to her death) but, as revealed by her agent Barry Langford, had kept her illness secret from all but a handful of her closest friends. Ringrose died from a heart attack just hours after Tamm's funeral on 7 August.

Tamm's autobiography, entitled First Generation, was published in September 2009 by Fantom Films. Before her death she had been working on a second part of her autobiography, Second Generation, which was published in 2014.

== Filmography ==
=== Film ===
Year	Title	Role	Notes
1973	Tales That Witness Madness	Ginny	(segment 4 "Luau")
1974	The Odessa File	Sigi	
1976	The Likely Lads	Christina	
1978	Rampage	Julie	
1987	Three Kinds of Heat	Piou	
2000	Sorted	School Mother	
2000	Melody's Her 2nd Name	Alex	
2001	Amazons and Gladiators	Zenobia	
2009	Doghouse	Meg Nut	

=== Television ===
Year	Title	Role	Notes
1973	Hunter's Walk	Ruth	Episode: "Reasonable Suspicion"
1973	The Donati Conspiracy	Sally Ross	Miniseries
1973, 2002	Coronation Street	Polly Ogden/Diana Black	3 episodes
1974	A Raging Calm	Julie Warner	3 episodes
1974	The Inheritors	Liz Fisher	Episode: "Double, Double..."
1974	Warship	Zimba	Episode: "The Immortal Memory"
1975	Whodunnit?	Valerie Austin	Episode "Nothing To Declare"
1975	Public Eye	Jenny	Episode: "How About It, Frank?"
1975	The Girls of Slender Means	Selina Redwood	All 3 episodes
1978–1979	Doctor Who	Romana I	Season 16
1978	Return of the Saint	Gerri Hanson	Episode: "The Debt Collectors"
1980	The Assassination Run	Jill Fraser	Miniseries
1981	The Treachery Game	Jill Fraser	Miniseries
1981	Only When I Laugh	Leonora	Episode: "Postman's Knock"
1982	Not the Nine O'Clock News	Various	Episode: "Made in Wales"
1983	Jane Eyre	Blanche Ingram	2 episodes
1984	Bergerac	Leslie West	Episode: "Tug of War"
1984	The Hello Goodbye Man	Jennifer Reynoldston	All 6 episodes
1986	Worlds Beyond	Susan Wentworth	Episode: "Guardian of the Past"
1989	Agatha Christie's Poirot	Mrs. Farley	Episode: "The Dream"
1989	Casualty	Virginia Wilson	Episode: "A Grand in the Hand"
1991	The Bill	Ms. Crosby	Episode: "Now We're Motoring"
1991	Perfect Scoundrels	Mary Cooper	Episode: "No Thanks for the Memory"
1993–1995	Brookside	Penny Crosbie	103 episodes
1997	The New Adventures of Robin Hood	Alice	Episode: "Witches of the Abbey"
1997	Crime Traveller	Mary Chandler	Episode: "A Death in the Family"
1997	Heartbeat	Marilyn	Episode: "Bad Apple"
1998	Loved by You	Spy Girl	Episode: "The Spy Girl Who Loved Me"
1999	CI5: The New Professionals	Maggie	Episode: "Phoenix"
2000	Doctors	Lyn Baker	Episode: "God's Will"
2000	Up Rising	House Buyer	Episode: "The Green Man"
2000	Headless	Portia Loomis	
2001	The Bill	Moira Sutherland	Episode: "Lick of Paint"
2001	Jonathan Creek	Vivian Brodie	Episode: "Satan's Chimney"
2002	Paradise Heights	Yvonne Edwards	5 episodes
2005	Twisted Tales	Mrs. Templeman	Episode: "Flat Four"
2005	Rose and Maloney	Danuta Richmond	Episode: "Alan Richmond"
2006	Doctors	Sylvia Crawford	Episode: "Mirror, Mirror"
2006	Holby City	Fliss Robson	Episode: "Crossing the Line"
2007	A Class Apart	Mrs Fills	TV film
2007	Diamond Geezer	Maureen Carlton	Episode: "A Royal Affair"
2007	Doctors	Jemma Forrester	Episode: "Dying to Please"
2008	Wire in the Blood	Elektra	2 episodes
2009	EastEnders	Orlenda	4 episodes
