= List of Doctor Who episodes =

For the British science-fiction television programme Doctor Who, List of Doctor Who episodes may refer to:

- List of Doctor Who episodes (1963–1989), a list of the 1963–1989 episodes and 1996 film of Doctor Who
- List of Doctor Who episodes (2005–2025), a list of the episodes starting from 2005 of Doctor Who

== Series overview ==
The following table dictates the season or series in question for the programme as a whole. The numbering system present is the same one used by the BBC; other sources may have alternate numbering.

=== Regular seasons ===
Season / Series	Era	Doctor	Episodes	Stories	Originally released (UK)		Average viewers (millions)	Average AI
Season / Series	Era	Doctor	Episodes	Stories	First released	Last released	Average viewers (millions)	Average AI
Season 1	Classic era	First Doctor	42	8	23 November 1963	12 September 1964	8.08	59
Season 2	Classic era	First Doctor	39	9	31 October 1964	24 July 1965	10.46	54
Season 3	Classic era	First Doctor	45	10	11 September 1965	16 July 1966	7.65	49
Season 4 (Note: The First Doctor remained for the first two serials of season 4. The Second Doctor featured for the remainder of the season from the third serial, The Power of the Daleks.)	Classic era	Second Doctor	43	9	10 September 1966	1 July 1967	7.10	49
Season 5	Classic era	Second Doctor	40	7	2 September 1967	1 June 1968	7.23	53
Season 6	Classic era	Second Doctor	44	7	10 August 1968	21 June 1969	6.38	54
Season 7	Classic era	Third Doctor	25	4	3 January 1970	20 June 1970	7.17	59
Season 8	Classic era	Third Doctor	25	5	2 January 1971	19 June 1971	7.96	–
Season 9	Classic era	Third Doctor	26	5	1 January 1972	24 June 1972	8.30	–
Season 10	Classic era	Third Doctor	26	5	30 December 1972	23 June 1973	8.87	–
Season 11	Classic era	Third Doctor	26	5	15 December 1973	8 June 1974	8.78	60
Season 12	Classic era	Fourth Doctor	20	5	28 December 1974	10 May 1975	10.00	56
Season 13	Classic era	Fourth Doctor	26	6	30 August 1975	6 March 1976	10.14	57
Season 14	Classic era	Fourth Doctor	26	6	4 September 1976	2 April 1977	11.08	59
Season 15	Classic era	Fourth Doctor	26	6	3 September 1977	11 March 1978	8.98	62
Season 16 (Note: Also known by its subtitle, The Key to Time)	Classic era	Fourth Doctor	26	6	2 September 1978	24 February 1979	8.61	64
Season 17	Classic era	Fourth Doctor	20	5 (Note: Shada was left unfinished due to a strike. The story was later completed and officially released on home media in 2017. It is not included in the episode or story counts as it was not broadcast.)	1 September 1979	12 January 1980	11.21	65
Season 18	Classic era	Fourth Doctor	28	7	30 August 1980	21 March 1981	5.82	63
Season 19	Classic era	Fifth Doctor	26	7	4 January 1982	30 March 1982	9.24	–
Season 20	Classic era	Fifth Doctor	22	6	3 January 1983	16 March 1983	7.03	67
Season 21 (Note: The Fifth Doctor regenerated in the sixth serial of season 21. The Sixth Doctor featured only in the final serial, The Twin Dilemma.)	Classic era	Fifth Doctor	24	7	5 January 1984	30 March 1984	7.14	65
Season 22	Classic era	Sixth Doctor	13	6	5 January 1985	30 March 1985	7.12	64
Season 23 (Note: Also known by its subtitle, The Trial of a Time Lord)	Classic era	Sixth Doctor	14	1	6 September 1986	6 December 1986	4.81	69
Season 24	Classic era	Seventh Doctor	14	4	7 September 1987	7 December 1987	4.94	60
Season 25	Classic era	Seventh Doctor	14	4	5 October 1988	4 January 1989	5.34	68
Season 26	Classic era	Seventh Doctor	14	4	6 September 1989	6 December 1989	4.15	68
Series 1	Revived era	Ninth Doctor	13	10	26 March 2005	18 June 2005	7.95	82
Series 2	Revived era	Tenth Doctor	13	10	15 April 2006	8 July 2006	7.71	84
Series 3	Revived era	Tenth Doctor	13	9	31 March 2007	30 June 2007	7.55	86
Series 4	Revived era	Tenth Doctor	13	10	5 April 2008	5 July 2008	8.05	88
Series 5	Revived era	Eleventh Doctor	13	10	3 April 2010	26 June 2010	7.25	86
Series 6	Revived era	Eleventh Doctor	13	11	23 April 2011	1 October 2011	7.52	86
Series 7	Revived era	Eleventh Doctor	13	13	1 September 2012	18 May 2013	7.44	86
Series 8	Revived era	Twelfth Doctor	12	11	23 August 2014	8 November 2014	7.26	83
Series 9	Revived era	Twelfth Doctor	12	9	19 September 2015	5 December 2015	6.03	82
Series 10	Revived era	Twelfth Doctor	12	11	15 April 2017	1 July 2017	5.46	83
Series 11	Revived era	Thirteenth Doctor	10	10	7 October 2018	9 December 2018	7.96	81
Series 12	Revived era	Thirteenth Doctor	10	8	1 January 2020	1 March 2020	5.40	80
Series 13 (Note: Also known by its subtitle, Flux)	Revived era	Thirteenth Doctor	6	1	31 October 2021	5 December 2021	4.95	77
Series 14 (Note: Also known by its official numbering, Season 1)	Revived era	Fifteenth Doctor	8	7	11 May 2024	22 June 2024	3.97	78
Series 15 (Note: Also known by its official numbering, Season 2)	Revived era	Fifteenth Doctor	8	7	12 April 2025	31 May 2025	3.23	–

=== Specials ===
Special(s)	Doctor	Episodes	Originally released		Average viewers (millions)	Average AI
Special(s)	Doctor	Episodes	First released	Last released	Average viewers (millions)	Average AI
20th anniversary	Fifth Doctor	1	25 November 1983		7.70	75
Television film	Eighth Doctor	1	12 May 1996		9.08	75
2005 Christmas	Tenth Doctor	1	25 December 2005		9.84	84
2006 Christmas	Tenth Doctor	1	25 December 2006		9.35	84
2007 Christmas	Tenth Doctor	1	25 December 2007		13.31	86
2008–2010 specials (Note: These specials consist of the 2008 Christmas, 2009 Easter, November, and Christmas, and 2010 New Year's Day episodes.)	Tenth Doctor	5	25 December 2008	1 January 2010	11.19	88
2010 Christmas	Eleventh Doctor	1	25 December 2010		12.11	83
2011 Christmas	Eleventh Doctor	1	25 December 2011		10.77	84
2012 Christmas	Eleventh Doctor	1	25 December 2012		9.87	87
2013 specials (Note: These specials consist of the 50th anniversary and 2013 Christmas episodes.)	Eleventh Doctor	2	23 November 2013	25 December 2013	11.97	86
2014 Christmas	Twelfth Doctor	1	25 December 2014		8.28	82
2015 Christmas	Twelfth Doctor	1	25 December 2015		7.69	82
2016 Christmas	Twelfth Doctor	1	25 December 2016		7.83	82
2017 Christmas	Twelfth Doctor	1	25 December 2017		7.92	81
2019 New Year	Thirteenth Doctor	1	1 January 2019		7.13	80
2021 New Year	Thirteenth Doctor	1	1 January 2021		6.36	79
2022 specials (Note: These specials consist of the 2022 New Year's Day, Easter, and BBC centenary episodes.)	Thirteenth Doctor	3	1 January 2022	23 October 2022	4.39	–
2023 specials (Note: These specials consist of the 60th anniversary episodes.)	Fourteenth Doctor	3	25 November 2023	9 December 2023	7.20	84
2023 Christmas	Fifteenth Doctor	1	25 December 2023		7.49	82
2024 Christmas	Fifteenth Doctor	1	25 December 2024		6.33	76

== See also ==
- List of Doctor Who Christmas and New Year's specials, a list of Doctor Who episodes which were Christmas or New Year's Day specials
- List of supplementary Doctor Who episodes, a list of supplementary Doctor Who episodes
