= List of Doctor Who episodes (1963–1989) =

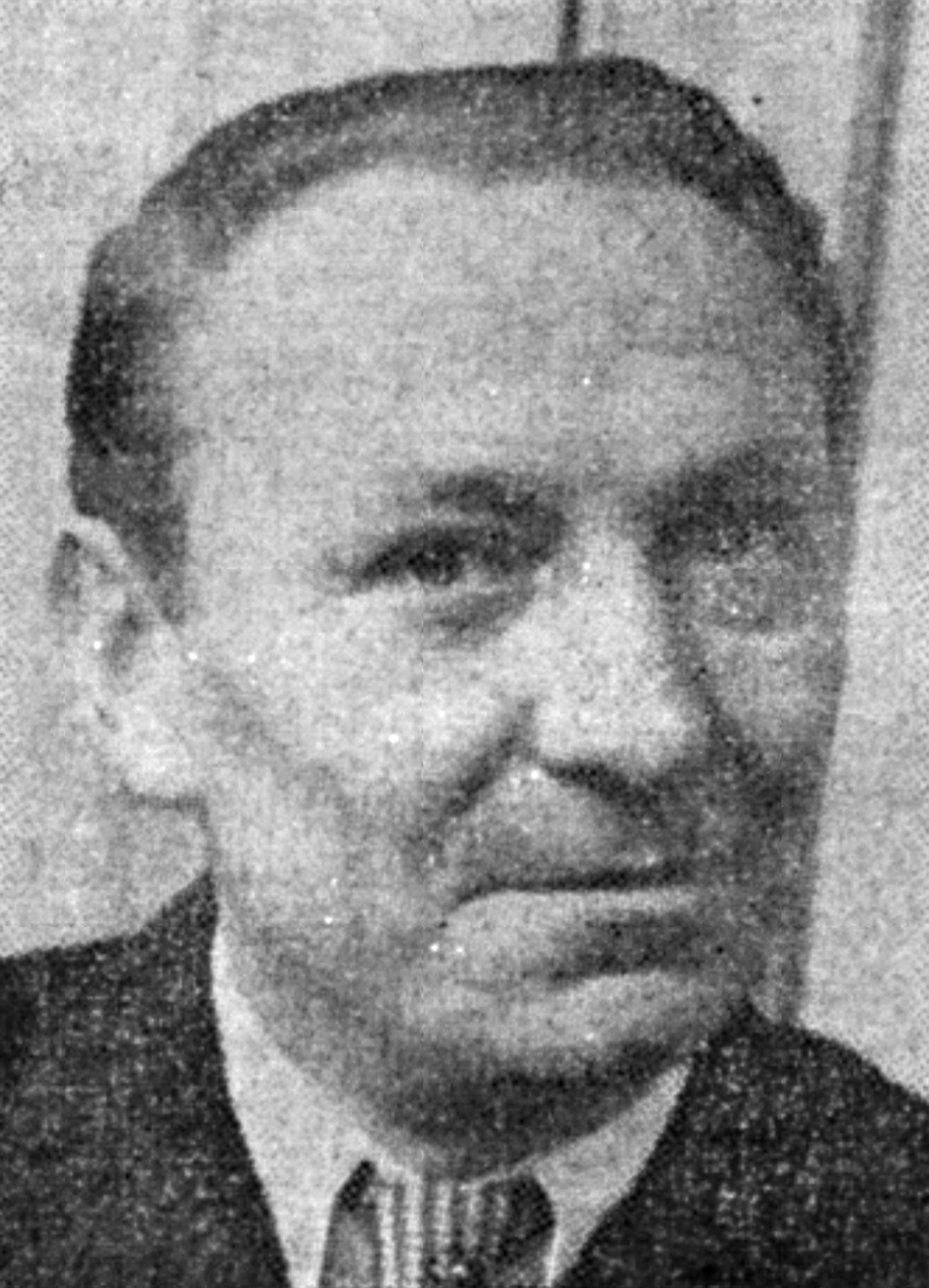
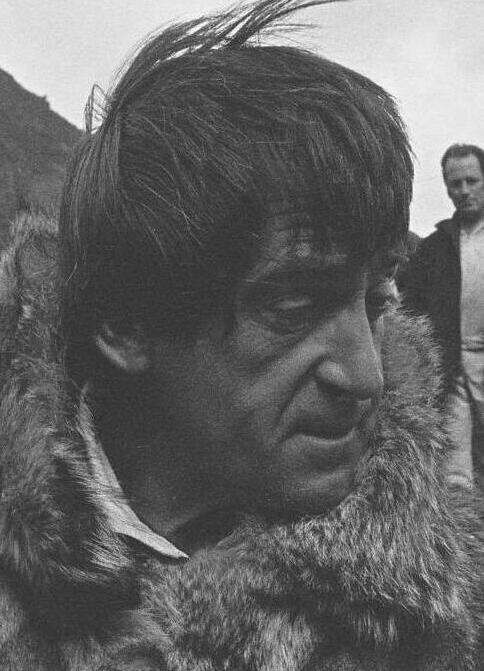
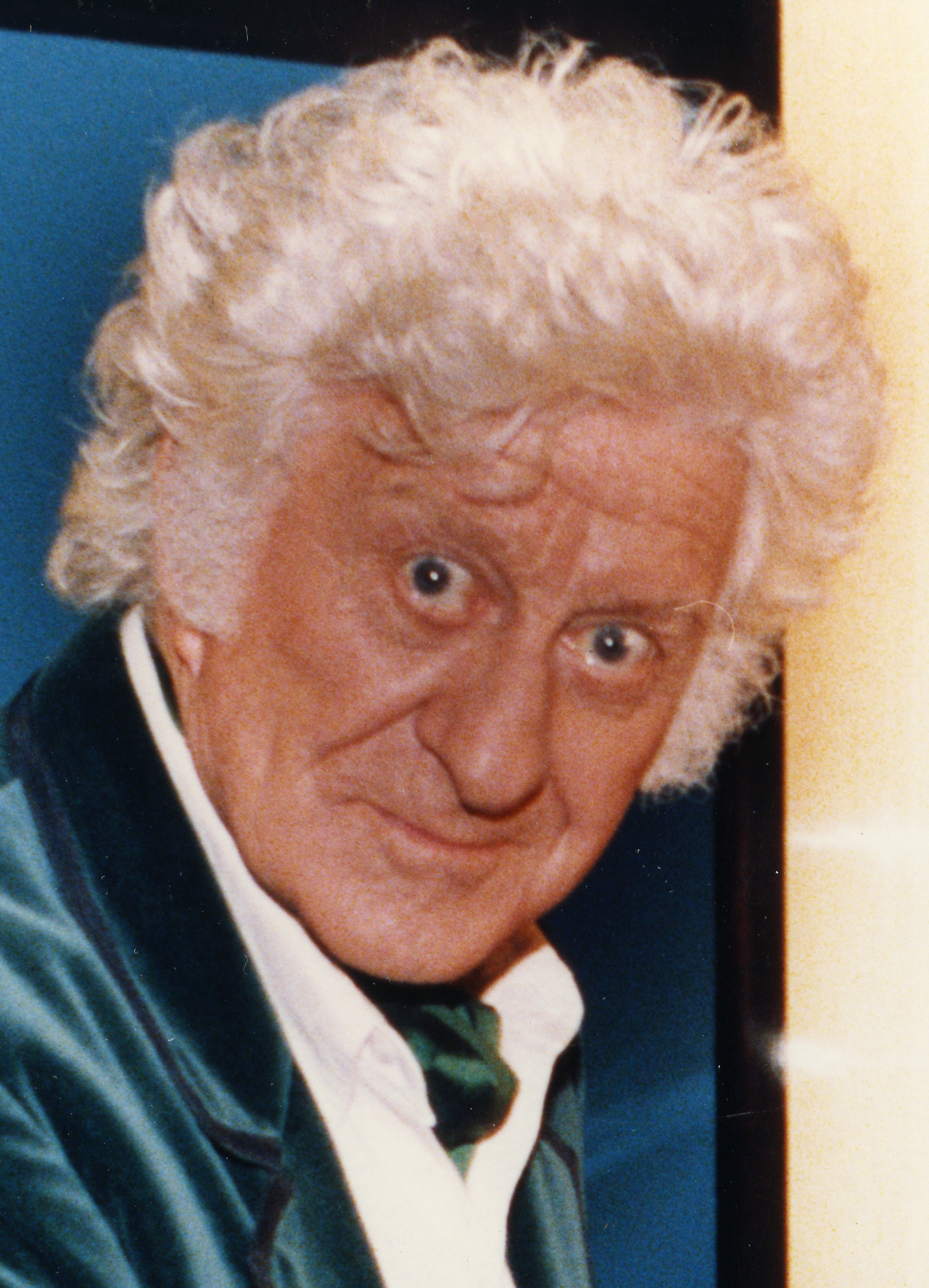
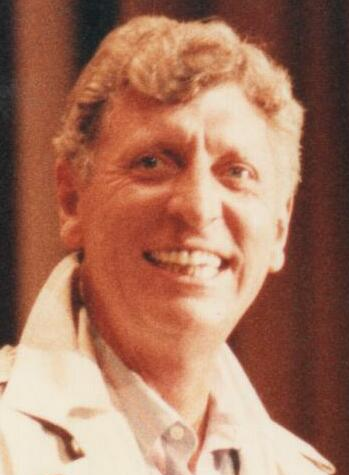
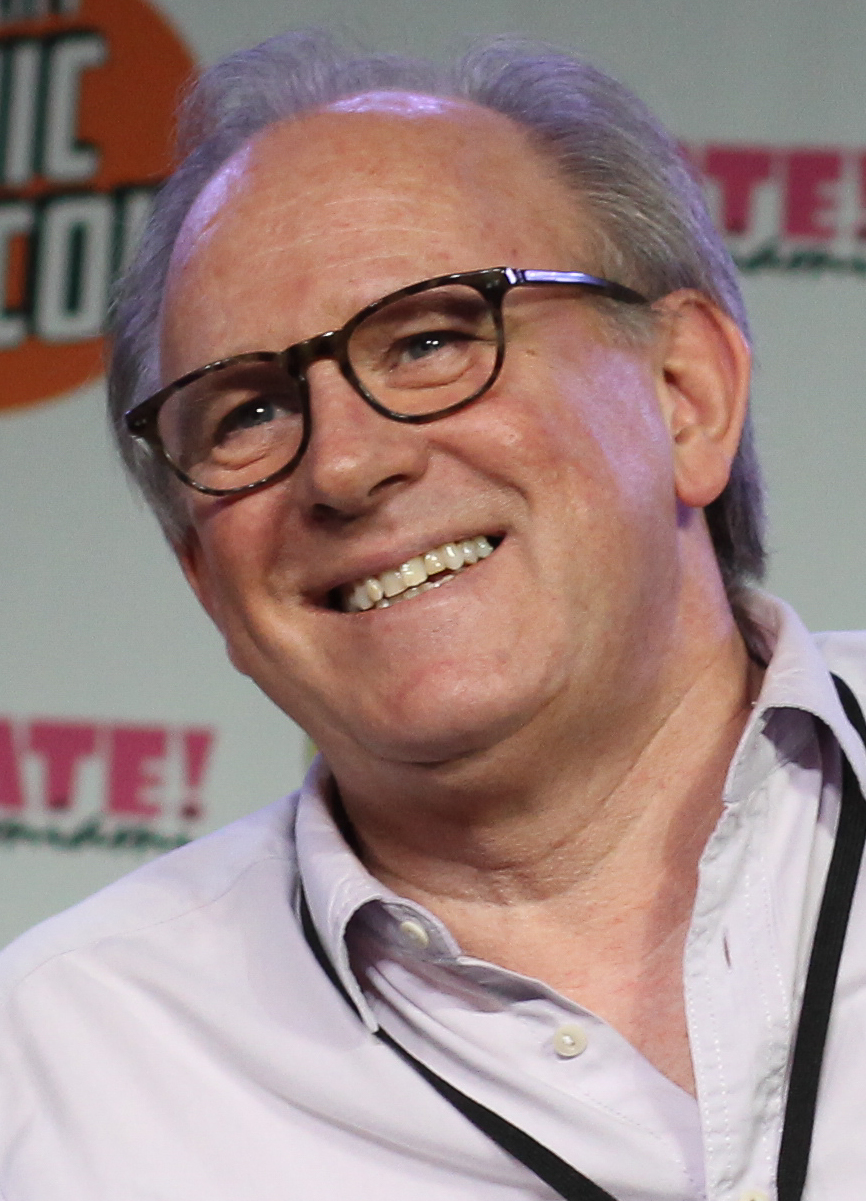
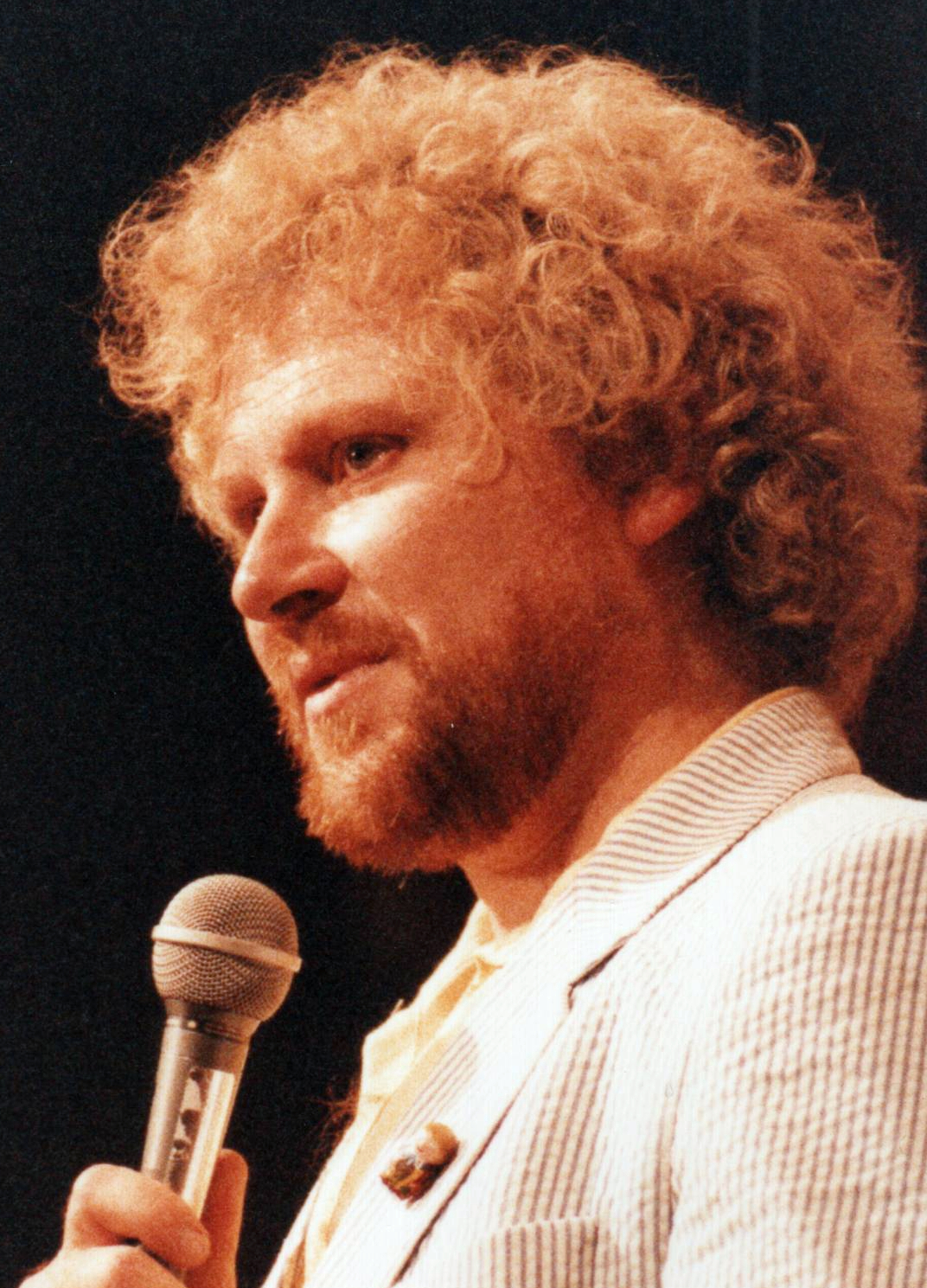
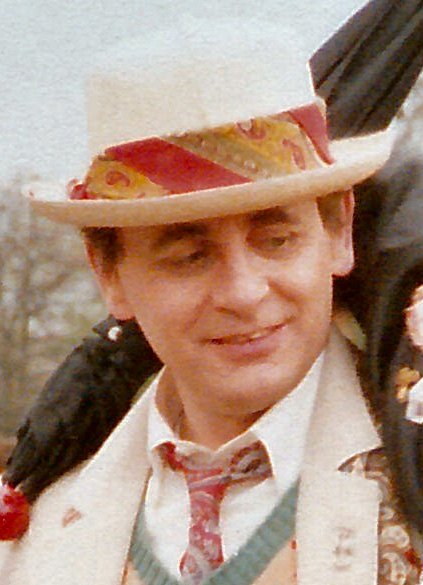
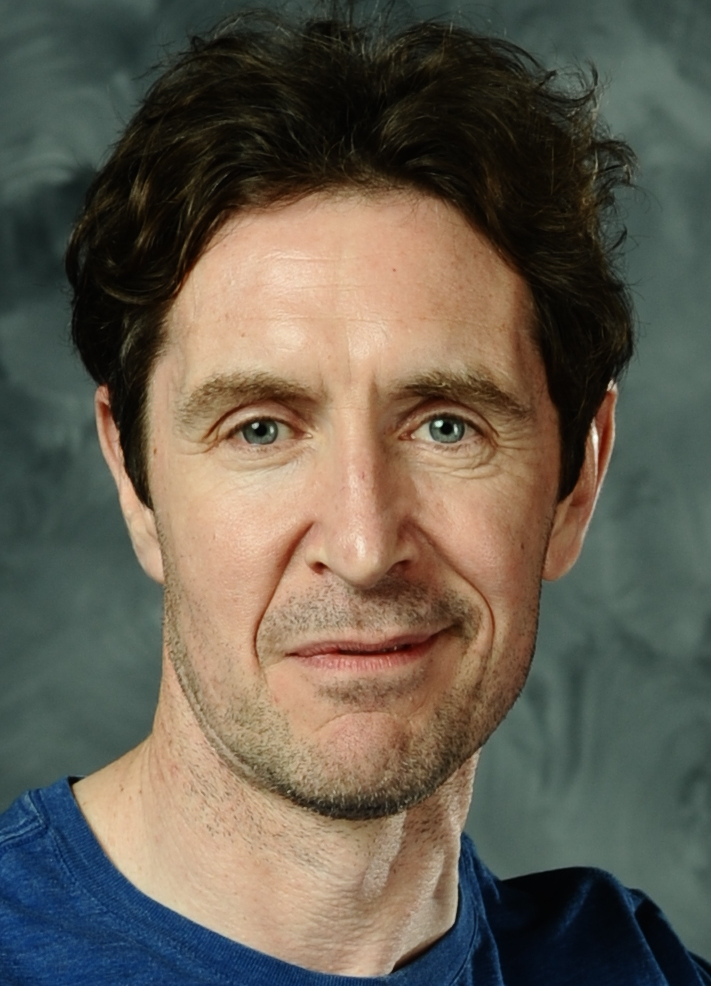
Eight actors led the classic era of Doctor Who. Top: William Hartnell, Patrick Troughton, Jon Pertwee, Tom Baker. Bottom: Peter Davison, Colin Baker, Sylvester McCoy, Paul McGann.

Doctor Who is a British science fiction television programme produced by the BBC. Doctor Who ceased production in 1989 after 695 episodes. A one-off TV movie was produced in the United States in 1996, before the series resumed in 2005. The original series (1963–1989), generally consists of multi-episode serials; in the early seasons, and occasionally through its run, serials tend to link together, one story leading directly into the next. The 2005 revival trades the earlier serial format for a run of self-contained episodes, interspersed with occasional multi-part stories and structured into loose story arcs.

As of 31 May 2025, 892 episodes of Doctor Who have aired. This includes one television movie and multiple specials, and encompasses 319 stories over 41 seasons, starting in 1963. Additionally, several charity specials and animated serials have been aired. The programme's high episode count has resulted in Doctor Who holding the world record for the highest number of episodes of a science-fiction programme.

For the first two seasons of Doctor Who and most of the third (1963–1966), each episode carries its own title; the show displays no titles for overarching serials until The Savages, at which point the episodic titles cease. The titles below, for these early serials, are those in most common circulation, used for commercial releases and in resources. The story numbers below are meant as a guide to placement in the overall context of the programme. There is some dispute, for instance, about whether to count Season 23's The Trial of a Time Lord as one or as four serials, and whether the unfinished serial Shada should be included. The numbering scheme in this list follows the official website's episode guide. (Note: Other sources, such as the Region 1 classic Doctor Who DVD releases, use different numbering schemes, which diverge after the 108th story, The Horns of Nimon (1979–1980).)

Due to the BBC's 1970s junking policy, 95 episodes of Doctor Who from the 1960s are no longer known to exist. As a result, 26 of the 50 serials from the 1960s are currently incomplete, with one or more episodes represented only by audio, which in many cases is in addition to clips or still frames. For commercial release, some episodes have been reconstructed using off-air audio recordings, paired to surviving visuals or newly commissioned animation.

== Series overview ==
The following table dictates the season or series in question for the programme as a whole. The numbering system present is the same one used by the BBC; other sources may have alternate numbering.

=== Regular seasons ===
Season / Series	Era	Doctor	Episodes	Stories	Originally released (UK)		Average viewers (millions)	Average AI
Season / Series	Era	Doctor	Episodes	Stories	First released	Last released	Average viewers (millions)	Average AI
Season 1	Classic era	First Doctor	42	8	23 November 1963	12 September 1964	8.08	59
Season 2	Classic era	First Doctor	39	9	31 October 1964	24 July 1965	10.46	54
Season 3	Classic era	First Doctor	45	10	11 September 1965	16 July 1966	7.65	49
Season 4 (Note: The First Doctor remained for the first two serials of season 4. The Second Doctor featured for the remainder of the season from the third serial, The Power of the Daleks.)	Classic era	Second Doctor	43	9	10 September 1966	1 July 1967	7.10	49
Season 5	Classic era	Second Doctor	40	7	2 September 1967	1 June 1968	7.23	53
Season 6	Classic era	Second Doctor	44	7	10 August 1968	21 June 1969	6.38	54
Season 7	Classic era	Third Doctor	25	4	3 January 1970	20 June 1970	7.17	59
Season 8	Classic era	Third Doctor	25	5	2 January 1971	19 June 1971	7.96	–
Season 9	Classic era	Third Doctor	26	5	1 January 1972	24 June 1972	8.30	–
Season 10	Classic era	Third Doctor	26	5	30 December 1972	23 June 1973	8.87	–
Season 11	Classic era	Third Doctor	26	5	15 December 1973	8 June 1974	8.78	60
Season 12	Classic era	Fourth Doctor	20	5	28 December 1974	10 May 1975	10.00	56
Season 13	Classic era	Fourth Doctor	26	6	30 August 1975	6 March 1976	10.14	57
Season 14	Classic era	Fourth Doctor	26	6	4 September 1976	2 April 1977	11.08	59
Season 15	Classic era	Fourth Doctor	26	6	3 September 1977	11 March 1978	8.98	62
Season 16 (Note: Also known by its subtitle, The Key to Time)	Classic era	Fourth Doctor	26	6	2 September 1978	24 February 1979	8.61	64
Season 17	Classic era	Fourth Doctor	20	5 (Note: Shada was left unfinished due to a strike. The story was later completed and officially released on home media in 2017. It is not included in the episode or story counts as it was not broadcast.)	1 September 1979	12 January 1980	11.21	65
Season 18	Classic era	Fourth Doctor	28	7	30 August 1980	21 March 1981	5.82	63
Season 19	Classic era	Fifth Doctor	26	7	4 January 1982	30 March 1982	9.24	–
Season 20	Classic era	Fifth Doctor	22	6	3 January 1983	16 March 1983	7.03	67
Season 21 (Note: The Fifth Doctor regenerated in the sixth serial of season 21. The Sixth Doctor featured only in the final serial, The Twin Dilemma.)	Classic era	Fifth Doctor	24	7	5 January 1984	30 March 1984	7.14	65
Season 22	Classic era	Sixth Doctor	13	6	5 January 1985	30 March 1985	7.12	64
Season 23 (Note: Also known by its subtitle, The Trial of a Time Lord)	Classic era	Sixth Doctor	14	1	6 September 1986	6 December 1986	4.81	69
Season 24	Classic era	Seventh Doctor	14	4	7 September 1987	7 December 1987	4.94	60
Season 25	Classic era	Seventh Doctor	14	4	5 October 1988	4 January 1989	5.34	68
Season 26	Classic era	Seventh Doctor	14	4	6 September 1989	6 December 1989	4.15	68
Series 1	Revived era	Ninth Doctor	13	10	26 March 2005	18 June 2005	7.95	82
Series 2	Revived era	Tenth Doctor	13	10	15 April 2006	8 July 2006	7.71	84
Series 3	Revived era	Tenth Doctor	13	9	31 March 2007	30 June 2007	7.55	86
Series 4	Revived era	Tenth Doctor	13	10	5 April 2008	5 July 2008	8.05	88
Series 5	Revived era	Eleventh Doctor	13	10	3 April 2010	26 June 2010	7.25	86
Series 6	Revived era	Eleventh Doctor	13	11	23 April 2011	1 October 2011	7.52	86
Series 7	Revived era	Eleventh Doctor	13	13	1 September 2012	18 May 2013	7.44	86
Series 8	Revived era	Twelfth Doctor	12	11	23 August 2014	8 November 2014	7.26	83
Series 9	Revived era	Twelfth Doctor	12	9	19 September 2015	5 December 2015	6.03	82
Series 10	Revived era	Twelfth Doctor	12	11	15 April 2017	1 July 2017	5.46	83
Series 11	Revived era	Thirteenth Doctor	10	10	7 October 2018	9 December 2018	7.96	81
Series 12	Revived era	Thirteenth Doctor	10	8	1 January 2020	1 March 2020	5.40	80
Series 13 (Note: Also known by its subtitle, Flux)	Revived era	Thirteenth Doctor	6	1	31 October 2021	5 December 2021	4.95	77
Series 14 (Note: Also known by its official numbering, Season 1)	Revived era	Fifteenth Doctor	8	7	11 May 2024	22 June 2024	3.97	78
Series 15 (Note: Also known by its official numbering, Season 2)	Revived era	Fifteenth Doctor	8	7	12 April 2025	31 May 2025	3.23	–

=== Specials ===
Special(s)	Doctor	Episodes	Originally released		Average viewers (millions)	Average AI
Special(s)	Doctor	Episodes	First released	Last released	Average viewers (millions)	Average AI
20th anniversary	Fifth Doctor	1	25 November 1983		7.70	75
Television film	Eighth Doctor	1	12 May 1996		9.08	75
2005 Christmas	Tenth Doctor	1	25 December 2005		9.84	84
2006 Christmas	Tenth Doctor	1	25 December 2006		9.35	84
2007 Christmas	Tenth Doctor	1	25 December 2007		13.31	86
2008–2010 specials (Note: These specials consist of the 2008 Christmas, 2009 Easter, November, and Christmas, and 2010 New Year's Day episodes.)	Tenth Doctor	5	25 December 2008	1 January 2010	11.19	88
2010 Christmas	Eleventh Doctor	1	25 December 2010		12.11	83
2011 Christmas	Eleventh Doctor	1	25 December 2011		10.77	84
2012 Christmas	Eleventh Doctor	1	25 December 2012		9.87	87
2013 specials (Note: These specials consist of the 50th anniversary and 2013 Christmas episodes.)	Eleventh Doctor	2	23 November 2013	25 December 2013	11.97	86
2014 Christmas	Twelfth Doctor	1	25 December 2014		8.28	82
2015 Christmas	Twelfth Doctor	1	25 December 2015		7.69	82
2016 Christmas	Twelfth Doctor	1	25 December 2016		7.83	82
2017 Christmas	Twelfth Doctor	1	25 December 2017		7.92	81
2019 New Year	Thirteenth Doctor	1	1 January 2019		7.13	80
2021 New Year	Thirteenth Doctor	1	1 January 2021		6.36	79
2022 specials (Note: These specials consist of the 2022 New Year's Day, Easter, and BBC centenary episodes.)	Thirteenth Doctor	3	1 January 2022	23 October 2022	4.39	–
2023 specials (Note: These specials consist of the 60th anniversary episodes.)	Fourteenth Doctor	3	25 November 2023	9 December 2023	7.20	84
2023 Christmas	Fifteenth Doctor	1	25 December 2023		7.49	82
2024 Christmas	Fifteenth Doctor	1	25 December 2024		6.33	76

== Episodes ==
=== First Doctor ===
The first incarnation of the Doctor was portrayed by William Hartnell. During Hartnell's tenure, the episodes were a mixture of stories set on Earth of the future with extraterrestrial influence, on alien planets, and in historical events without extraterrestrial influence, such as Marco Polo, one of the lost serials. In his last story, The Tenth Planet, the Doctor gradually grew weaker to the point of collapsing at the end of the fourth episode, leading to his regeneration.

==== Season 1 (1963–1964) ====
No. story	No. in season	Serial title	Episode titles	Directed by	Written by	Original release date	Prod. code	UK viewers (millions) (Note: Attributed to multiple sources)	AI
1	1	An Unearthly Child	"An Unearthly Child"	Waris Hussein	Anthony Coburn and C. E. Webber (uncredited)	23 November 1963	A	4.4	63
1	1	An Unearthly Child	"The Cave of Skulls"	Waris Hussein	Anthony Coburn	30 November 1963	A	5.9	59
1	1	An Unearthly Child	"The Forest of Fear"	Waris Hussein	Anthony Coburn	7 December 1963	A	6.9	56
1	1	An Unearthly Child	"The Firemaker"	Waris Hussein	Anthony Coburn	14 December 1963	A	6.4	55
2	2	The Daleks	"The Dead Planet"	Christopher Barry	Terry Nation	21 December 1963	B	6.9	59
2	2	The Daleks	"The Survivors"	Christopher Barry	Terry Nation	28 December 1963	B	6.4	58
2	2	The Daleks	"The Escape"	Richard Martin	Terry Nation	4 January 1964	B	8.9	63
2	2	The Daleks	"The Ambush"	Christopher Barry	Terry Nation	11 January 1964	B	9.9	63
2	2	The Daleks	"The Expedition"	Christopher Barry	Terry Nation	18 January 1964	B	9.9	63
2	2	The Daleks	"The Ordeal"	Richard Martin	Terry Nation	25 January 1964	B	10.4	63
2	2	The Daleks	"The Rescue"	Richard Martin	Terry Nation	1 February 1964	B	10.4	65
3	3	The Edge of Destruction	"The Edge of Destruction"	Richard Martin	David Whitaker	8 February 1964	C	10.4	61
3	3	The Edge of Destruction	"The Brink of Disaster"	Frank Cox	David Whitaker	15 February 1964	C	9.9	60
4	4	Marco Polo	"The Roof of the World"^{†}	Waris Hussein	John Lucarotti	22 February 1964	D	9.4	63
4	4	Marco Polo	"The Singing Sands"^{†}	Waris Hussein	John Lucarotti	29 February 1964	D	9.4	62
4	4	Marco Polo	"Five Hundred Eyes"^{†}	Waris Hussein	John Lucarotti	7 March 1964	D	9.4	62
4	4	Marco Polo	"The Wall of Lies"^{†}	John Crockett	John Lucarotti	14 March 1964	D	9.9	60
4	4	Marco Polo	"Rider from Shang-Tu"^{†}	Waris Hussein	John Lucarotti	21 March 1964	D	9.4	59
4	4	Marco Polo	"Mighty Kublai Khan"^{†}	Waris Hussein	John Lucarotti	28 March 1964	D	8.4	59
4	4	Marco Polo	"Assassin at Peking"^{†}	Waris Hussein	John Lucarotti	4 April 1964	D	10.4	59
5	5	The Keys of Marinus	"The Sea of Death"	John Gorrie	Terry Nation	11 April 1964	E	9.9	62
5	5	The Keys of Marinus	"The Velvet Web"	John Gorrie	Terry Nation	18 April 1964	E	9.4	60
5	5	The Keys of Marinus	"The Screaming Jungle"	John Gorrie	Terry Nation	25 April 1964	E	9.9	61
5	5	The Keys of Marinus	"The Snows of Terror"	John Gorrie	Terry Nation	2 May 1964	E	10.4	60
5	5	The Keys of Marinus	"Sentence of Death"	John Gorrie	Terry Nation	9 May 1964	E	7.9	61
5	5	The Keys of Marinus	"The Keys of Marinus"	John Gorrie	Terry Nation	16 May 1964	E	6.9	63
6	6	The Aztecs	"The Temple of Evil"	John Crockett	John Lucarotti	23 May 1964	F	7.4	62
6	6	The Aztecs	"The Warriors of Death"	John Crockett	John Lucarotti	30 May 1964	F	7.4	62
6	6	The Aztecs	"The Bride of Sacrifice"	John Crockett	John Lucarotti	6 June 1964	F	7.9	57
6	6	The Aztecs	"The Day of Darkness"	John Crockett	John Lucarotti	13 June 1964	F	7.4	58
7	7	The Sensorites	"Strangers in Space"	Mervyn Pinfield	Peter R. Newman	20 June 1964	G	7.9	59
7	7	The Sensorites	"The Unwilling Warriors"	Mervyn Pinfield	Peter R. Newman	27 June 1964	G	6.9	59
7	7	The Sensorites	"Hidden Danger"	Mervyn Pinfield	Peter R. Newman	11 July 1964	G	7.4	56
7	7	The Sensorites	"A Race Against Death"	Mervyn Pinfield	Peter R. Newman	18 July 1964	G	5.5	60
7	7	The Sensorites	"Kidnap"	Frank Cox	Peter R. Newman	25 July 1964	G	6.9	57
7	7	The Sensorites	"A Desperate Venture"	Frank Cox	Peter R. Newman	1 August 1964	G	6.9	57
8	8	The Reign of Terror	"A Land of Fear"	Henric Hirsch	Dennis Spooner	8 August 1964	H	6.9	58
8	8	The Reign of Terror	"Guests of Madame Guillotine"	Henric Hirsch	Dennis Spooner	15 August 1964	H	6.9	54
8	8	The Reign of Terror	"A Change of Identity"	Henric Hirsch	Dennis Spooner	22 August 1964	H	6.9	55
8	8	The Reign of Terror	"The Tyrant of France"^{†}	Henric Hirsch	Dennis Spooner	29 August 1964	H	6.4	53
8	8	The Reign of Terror	"A Bargain of Necessity"^{†}	Henric Hirsch	Dennis Spooner	5 September 1964	H	6.9	53
8	8	The Reign of Terror	"Prisoners of Conciergerie"	Henric Hirsch	Dennis Spooner	12 September 1964	H	6.4	55

^† Episode is missing

==== Season 2 (1964–1965) ====
This season saw the departure of Carole Ann Ford as Susan Foreman in The Dalek Invasion of Earth, replaced by Maureen O'Brien as Vicki in The Rescue. William Russell and Jacqueline Hill also departed their roles as Ian Chesterton and Barbara Wright, respectively, in The Chase, replaced by Peter Purves as Steven Taylor.

No. story	No. in season	Serial title	Episode titles	Directed by	Written by	Original release date	Prod. code	UK viewers (millions) (Note: Attributed to multiple sources)	AI
9	1	Planet of Giants	"Planet of Giants"	Mervyn Pinfield	Louis Marks	31 October 1964	J	8.4	57
9	1	Planet of Giants	"Dangerous Journey"	Mervyn Pinfield	Louis Marks	7 November 1964	J	8.4	58
9	1	Planet of Giants	"Crisis"	Douglas Camfield	Louis Marks	14 November 1964	J	8.9	59
10	2	The Dalek Invasion of Earth	"World's End"	Richard Martin	Terry Nation	21 November 1964	K	11.4	63
10	2	The Dalek Invasion of Earth	"The Daleks"	Richard Martin	Terry Nation	28 November 1964	K	12.4	59
10	2	The Dalek Invasion of Earth	"Day of Reckoning"	Richard Martin	Terry Nation	5 December 1964	K	11.9	59
10	2	The Dalek Invasion of Earth	"The End of Tomorrow"	Richard Martin	Terry Nation	12 December 1964	K	11.9	59
10	2	The Dalek Invasion of Earth	"The Waking Ally"	Richard Martin	Terry Nation	19 December 1964	K	11.4	58
10	2	The Dalek Invasion of Earth	"Flashpoint"	Richard Martin	Terry Nation	26 December 1964	K	12.4	63
11	3	The Rescue	"The Powerful Enemy"	Christopher Barry	David Whitaker	2 January 1965	L	12.0	57
11	3	The Rescue	"Desperate Measures"	Christopher Barry	David Whitaker	9 January 1965	L	13.0	59
12	4	The Romans	"The Slave Traders"	Christopher Barry	Dennis Spooner	16 January 1965	M	13.0	53
12	4	The Romans	"All Roads Lead to Rome"	Christopher Barry	Dennis Spooner	23 January 1965	M	11.5	51
12	4	The Romans	"Conspiracy"	Christopher Barry	Dennis Spooner	30 January 1965	M	10.0	50
12	4	The Romans	"Inferno"	Christopher Barry	Dennis Spooner	6 February 1965	M	12.0	50
13	5	The Web Planet	"The Web Planet"	Richard Martin	Bill Strutton	13 February 1965	N	13.5	56
13	5	The Web Planet	"The Zarbi"	Richard Martin	Bill Strutton	20 February 1965	N	12.5	53
13	5	The Web Planet	"Escape to Danger"	Richard Martin	Bill Strutton	27 February 1965	N	12.5	53
13	5	The Web Planet	"Crater of Needles"	Richard Martin	Bill Strutton	6 March 1965	N	13.0	49
13	5	The Web Planet	"Invasion"	Richard Martin	Bill Strutton	13 March 1965	N	12.0	48
13	5	The Web Planet	"The Centre"	Richard Martin	Bill Strutton	20 March 1965	N	11.5	42
14	6	The Crusade	"The Lion"	Douglas Camfield	David Whitaker	27 March 1965	P	10.5	51
14	6	The Crusade	"The Knight of Jaffa"^{†}	Douglas Camfield	David Whitaker	3 April 1965	P	8.5	50
14	6	The Crusade	"The Wheel of Fortune"	Douglas Camfield	David Whitaker	10 April 1965	P	9.0	49
14	6	The Crusade	"The Warlords"^{†}	Douglas Camfield	David Whitaker	17 April 1965	P	9.5	48
15	7	The Space Museum	"The Space Museum"	Mervyn Pinfield	Glyn Jones	24 April 1965	Q	10.5	61
15	7	The Space Museum	"The Dimensions of Time"	Mervyn Pinfield	Glyn Jones	1 May 1965	Q	9.2	53
15	7	The Space Museum	"The Search"	Mervyn Pinfield	Glyn Jones	8 May 1965	Q	8.5	56
15	7	The Space Museum	"The Final Phase"	Mervyn Pinfield	Glyn Jones	15 May 1965	Q	8.5	49
16	8	The Chase	"The Executioners"	Richard Martin	Terry Nation	22 May 1965	R	10.0	57
16	8	The Chase	"The Death of Time"	Richard Martin	Terry Nation	29 May 1965	R	9.5	56
16	8	The Chase	"Flight Through Eternity"	Richard Martin	Terry Nation	5 June 1965	R	9.0	55
16	8	The Chase	"Journey into Terror"	Richard Martin	Terry Nation	12 June 1965	R	9.5	54
16	8	The Chase	"The Death of Doctor Who"	Richard Martin	Terry Nation	19 June 1965	R	9.0	56
16	8	The Chase	"The Planet of Decision"	Richard Martin	Terry Nation	26 June 1965	R	9.5	57
17	9	The Time Meddler	"The Watcher"	Douglas Camfield	Dennis Spooner	3 July 1965	S	8.9	57
17	9	The Time Meddler	"The Meddling Monk"	Douglas Camfield	Dennis Spooner	10 July 1965	S	8.8	49
17	9	The Time Meddler	"A Battle of Wits"	Douglas Camfield	Dennis Spooner	17 July 1965	S	7.7	53
17	9	The Time Meddler	"Checkmate"	Douglas Camfield	Dennis Spooner	24 July 1965	S	8.3	54

^† Episode is missing

==== Season 3 (1965–1966) ====
O'Brien departed the role of Vicki in The Myth Makers, replaced by Adrienne Hill as Katarina, and then later by Jackie Lane as Dodo Chaplet. The Savages marked the final appearance of Steven, and The War Machines introduced companions Ben and Polly. The practice of giving each individual episode a different title was abandoned after The Gunfighters, near the end of the season.

No. story	No. in season	Serial title	Episode titles	Directed by	Written by	Original release date	Prod. code	UK viewers (millions) (Note: Attributed to multiple sources)	AI
18	1	Galaxy 4	"Four Hundred Dawns"^{†}	Derek Martinus	William Emms	11 September 1965	T	9.0	56
18	1	Galaxy 4	"Trap of Steel"^{†}	Derek Martinus	William Emms	18 September 1965	T	9.5	55
18	1	Galaxy 4	"Air Lock"	Derek Martinus	William Emms	25 September 1965	T	11.3	54
18	1	Galaxy 4	"The Exploding Planet"^{†}	Derek Martinus	William Emms	2 October 1965	T	9.9	53
19	2	"Mission to the Unknown"^{†}	N/A	Derek Martinus	Terry Nation	9 October 1965	T/A	8.3	54
20	3	The Myth Makers	"Temple of Secrets"^{†}	Michael Leeston-Smith	Donald Cotton	16 October 1965	U	8.3	48
20	3	The Myth Makers	"Small Prophet, Quick Return"^{†}	Michael Leeston-Smith	Donald Cotton	23 October 1965	U	8.1	51
20	3	The Myth Makers	"Death of a Spy"^{†}	Michael Leeston-Smith	Donald Cotton	30 October 1965	U	8.7	49
20	3	The Myth Makers	"Horse of Destruction"^{†}	Michael Leeston-Smith	Donald Cotton	6 November 1965	U	8.3	52
21	4	The Daleks' Master Plan	"The Nightmare Begins"	Douglas Camfield	Terry Nation	13 November 1965	V	9.1	54
21	4	The Daleks' Master Plan	"Day of Armageddon"	Douglas Camfield	Terry Nation	20 November 1965	V	9.8	52
21	4	The Daleks' Master Plan	"Devil's Planet"	Douglas Camfield	Terry Nation	27 November 1965	V	10.3	52
21	4	The Daleks' Master Plan	"The Traitors"^{†}	Douglas Camfield	Terry Nation	4 December 1965	V	9.5	51
21	4	The Daleks' Master Plan	"Counter Plot"	Douglas Camfield	Terry Nation	11 December 1965	V	9.9	53
21	4	The Daleks' Master Plan	"Coronas of the Sun"^{†}	Douglas Camfield	Dennis Spooner	18 December 1965	V	9.1	56
21	4	The Daleks' Master Plan	"The Feast of Steven"^{†}	Douglas Camfield	Terry Nation	25 December 1965	V	7.9	39
21	4	The Daleks' Master Plan	"Volcano"^{†}	Douglas Camfield	Dennis Spooner	1 January 1966	V	9.6	49
21	4	The Daleks' Master Plan	"Golden Death"^{†}	Douglas Camfield	Dennis Spooner	8 January 1966	V	9.2	52
21	4	The Daleks' Master Plan	"Escape Switch"	Douglas Camfield	Dennis Spooner	15 January 1966	V	9.5	50
21	4	The Daleks' Master Plan	"The Abandoned Planet"^{†}	Douglas Camfield	Dennis Spooner	22 January 1966	V	9.8	49
21	4	The Daleks' Master Plan	"Destruction of Time"^{†}	Douglas Camfield	Dennis Spooner	29 January 1966	V	8.6	57
22	5	The Massacre	"War of God"^{†}	Paddy Russell	John Lucarotti	5 February 1966	W	8.0	52
22	5	The Massacre	"The Sea Beggar"^{†}	Paddy Russell	John Lucarotti	12 February 1966	W	6.0	52
22	5	The Massacre	"Priest of Death"^{†}	Paddy Russell	John Lucarotti	19 February 1966	W	5.9	49
22	5	The Massacre	"Bell of Doom"^{†}	Paddy Russell	John Lucarotti and Donald Tosh	26 February 1966	W	5.8	53
23	6	The Ark	"The Steel Sky"	Michael Imison	Paul Erickson and Lesley Scott	5 March 1966	X	5.5	55
23	6	The Ark	"The Plague"	Michael Imison	Paul Erickson and Lesley Scott	12 March 1966	X	6.9	56
23	6	The Ark	"The Return"	Michael Imison	Paul Erickson and Lesley Scott	19 March 1966	X	6.2	51
23	6	The Ark	"The Bomb"	Michael Imison	Paul Erickson and Lesley Scott	26 March 1966	X	7.3	50
24	7	The Celestial Toymaker	"The Celestial Toyroom"^{†}	Bill Sellars	Brian Hayles	2 April 1966	Y	8.0	48
24	7	The Celestial Toymaker	"The Hall of Dolls"^{†}	Bill Sellars	Brian Hayles	9 April 1966	Y	8.0	49
24	7	The Celestial Toymaker	"The Dancing Floor"^{†}	Bill Sellars	Brian Hayles	16 April 1966	Y	9.4	44
24	7	The Celestial Toymaker	"The Final Test"	Bill Sellars	Brian Hayles	23 April 1966	Y	7.8	43
25	8	The Gunfighters	"A Holiday for the Doctor"	Rex Tucker	Donald Cotton	30 April 1966	Z	6.5	45
25	8	The Gunfighters	"Don't Shoot the Pianist"	Rex Tucker	Donald Cotton	7 May 1966	Z	6.6	39
25	8	The Gunfighters	"Johnny Ringo"	Rex Tucker	Donald Cotton	14 May 1966	Z	6.2	36
25	8	The Gunfighters	"The O.K. Corral"	Rex Tucker	Donald Cotton	21 May 1966	Z	5.7	30
26	9	The Savages	"Episode 1"^{†}	Christopher Barry	Ian Stuart Black	28 May 1966	AA	4.8	48
26	9	The Savages	"Episode 2"^{†}	Christopher Barry	Ian Stuart Black	4 June 1966	AA	5.6	49
26	9	The Savages	"Episode 3"^{†}	Christopher Barry	Ian Stuart Black	11 June 1966	AA	5.0	48
26	9	The Savages	"Episode 4"^{†}	Christopher Barry	Ian Stuart Black	18 June 1966	AA	4.5	48
27	10	The War Machines	"Episode 1"	Michael Ferguson	Ian Stuart Black	25 June 1966	BB	5.4	49
27	10	The War Machines	"Episode 2"	Michael Ferguson	Ian Stuart Black	2 July 1966	BB	4.7	45
27	10	The War Machines	"Episode 3"	Michael Ferguson	Ian Stuart Black	9 July 1966	BB	5.3	44
27	10	The War Machines	"Episode 4"	Michael Ferguson	Ian Stuart Black	16 July 1966	BB	5.5	39

^†: Episode is missing

==== Season 4 (1966–1967) ====
The Smugglers and The Tenth Planet were the last serials to star the First Doctor, his regeneration to the Second occurring in the latter. It is also notable as the season with the most missing episodes, with not one serial existing in its entirety.

No. story	No. in season	Serial title	Episode titles	Directed by	Written by	Original release date	Prod. code	UK viewers (millions)	AI
28	1	The Smugglers	"Episode 1"^{†}	Julia Smith	Brian Hayles	10 September 1966	CC	4.3	47
28	1	The Smugglers	"Episode 2"^{†}	Julia Smith	Brian Hayles	17 September 1966	CC	4.9	45
28	1	The Smugglers	"Episode 3"^{†}	Julia Smith	Brian Hayles	24 September 1966	CC	4.2	43
28	1	The Smugglers	"Episode 4"^{†}	Julia Smith	Brian Hayles	1 October 1966	CC	4.5	43
29	2	The Tenth Planet	"Episode 1"	Derek Martinus	Kit Pedler	8 October 1966	DD	5.5	50
29	2	The Tenth Planet	"Episode 2"	Derek Martinus	Kit Pedler	15 October 1966	DD	6.4	48
29	2	The Tenth Planet	"Episode 3"	Derek Martinus	Kit Pedler and Gerry Davis	22 October 1966	DD	7.6	48
29	2	The Tenth Planet	"Episode 4"^{†}	Derek Martinus	Kit Pedler and Gerry Davis	29 October 1966	DD	7.5	47

^†: Episode is missing

=== Second Doctor ===
The Second Doctor was portrayed by Patrick Troughton, whose serials were more action-oriented than those of his predecessor. Additionally, after The Highlanders, stories moved away from the purely historical ones that featured during Hartnell's tenure; instead, any historical tales also included a science fiction element. Troughton retained the role until the last episode of The War Games when members of the Doctor's race, the Time Lords, put him on trial for breaking the laws of time. The Doctor was forced to regenerate and thereafter exiled on Earth.

==== Season 4 (1966–1967) continued ====
This season introduced companions Jamie McCrimmon (Frazer Hines) and Victoria Waterfield (Deborah Watling), in The Highlanders and The Evil of the Daleks, respectively. Ben and Polly departed in The Faceless Ones.

No. story	No. in season	Serial title	Episode titles	Directed by	Written by	Original release date	Prod. code	UK viewers (millions)	AI
30	3	The Power of the Daleks	"Episode One"^{†}	Christopher Barry	David Whitaker and Dennis Spooner (uncredited)	5 November 1966	EE	7.9	43
30	3	The Power of the Daleks	"Episode Two"^{†}	Christopher Barry	David Whitaker and Dennis Spooner (uncredited)	12 November 1966	EE	7.8	45
30	3	The Power of the Daleks	"Episode Three"^{†}	Christopher Barry	David Whitaker and Dennis Spooner (uncredited)	19 November 1966	EE	7.5	44
30	3	The Power of the Daleks	"Episode Four"^{†}	Christopher Barry	David Whitaker and Dennis Spooner (uncredited)	26 November 1966	EE	7.8	47
30	3	The Power of the Daleks	"Episode Five"^{†}	Christopher Barry	David Whitaker and Dennis Spooner (uncredited)	3 December 1966	EE	8.0	48
30	3	The Power of the Daleks	"Episode Six"^{†}	Christopher Barry	David Whitaker and Dennis Spooner (uncredited)	10 December 1966	EE	7.8	47
31	4	The Highlanders	"Episode 1"^{†}	Hugh David	Elwyn Jones and Gerry Davis	17 December 1966	FF	6.7	47
31	4	The Highlanders	"Episode 2"^{†}	Hugh David	Elwyn Jones and Gerry Davis	24 December 1966	FF	6.8	46
31	4	The Highlanders	"Episode 3"^{†}	Hugh David	Elwyn Jones and Gerry Davis	31 December 1966	FF	7.4	47
31	4	The Highlanders	"Episode 4"^{†}	Hugh David	Elwyn Jones and Gerry Davis	7 January 1967	FF	7.3	47
32	5	The Underwater Menace	"Episode 1"^{†}	Julia Smith	Geoffrey Orme	14 January 1967	GG	8.3	48
32	5	The Underwater Menace	"Episode 2"	Julia Smith	Geoffrey Orme	21 January 1967	GG	7.5	46
32	5	The Underwater Menace	"Episode 3"	Julia Smith	Geoffrey Orme	28 January 1967	GG	7.1	45
32	5	The Underwater Menace	"Episode 4"^{†}	Julia Smith	Geoffrey Orme	4 February 1967	GG	7.0	47
33	6	The Moonbase	"Episode 1"^{†}	Morris Barry	Kit Pedler	11 February 1967	HH	8.1	50
33	6	The Moonbase	"Episode 2"	Morris Barry	Kit Pedler	18 February 1967	HH	8.9	49
33	6	The Moonbase	"Episode 3"^{†}	Morris Barry	Kit Pedler	25 February 1967	HH	8.2	53
33	6	The Moonbase	"Episode 4"	Morris Barry	Kit Pedler	4 March 1967	HH	8.1	58
34	7	The Macra Terror	"Episode 1"^{†}	John Davies	Ian Stuart Black	11 March 1967	JJ	8.0	50
34	7	The Macra Terror	"Episode 2"^{†}	John Davies	Ian Stuart Black	18 March 1967	JJ	7.9	48
34	7	The Macra Terror	"Episode 3"^{†}	John Davies	Ian Stuart Black	25 March 1967	JJ	8.5	52
34	7	The Macra Terror	"Episode 4"^{†}	John Davies	Ian Stuart Black	1 April 1967	JJ	8.4	49
35	8	The Faceless Ones	"Episode 1"	Gerry Mill	David Ellis and Malcolm Hulke	8 April 1967	KK	8.0	51
35	8	The Faceless Ones	"Episode 2"^{†}	Gerry Mill	David Ellis and Malcolm Hulke	15 April 1967	KK	6.4	50
35	8	The Faceless Ones	"Episode 3"	Gerry Mill	David Ellis and Malcolm Hulke	22 April 1967	KK	7.9	53
35	8	The Faceless Ones	"Episode 4"^{†}	Gerry Mill	David Ellis and Malcolm Hulke	29 April 1967	KK	6.9	55
35	8	The Faceless Ones	"Episode 5"^{†}	Gerry Mill	David Ellis and Malcolm Hulke	6 May 1967	KK	7.1	55
35	8	The Faceless Ones	"Episode 6"^{†}	Gerry Mill	David Ellis and Malcolm Hulke	13 May 1967	KK	8.0	52
36	9	The Evil of the Daleks	"Episode 1"^{†}	Derek Martinus	David Whitaker	20 May 1967	LL	8.1	51
36	9	The Evil of the Daleks	"Episode 2"	Derek Martinus	David Whitaker	27 May 1967	LL	7.5	51
36	9	The Evil of the Daleks	"Episode 3"^{†}	Derek Martinus	David Whitaker	3 June 1967	LL	6.1	52
36	9	The Evil of the Daleks	"Episode 4"^{†}	Derek Martinus	David Whitaker	10 June 1967	LL	5.3	51
36	9	The Evil of the Daleks	"Episode 5"^{†}	Derek Martinus	David Whitaker	17 June 1967	LL	5.1	53
36	9	The Evil of the Daleks	"Episode 6"^{†}	Derek Martinus	David Whitaker	24 June 1967	LL	6.8	49
36	9	The Evil of the Daleks	"Episode 7"^{†}	Derek Martinus	David Whitaker	1 July 1967	LL	6.1	56

^†: Episode is missing

==== Season 5 (1967–1968) ====
This season saw the departure of Watling as Victoria, and the debut appearances of Wendy Padbury and Nicholas Courtney as Zoe and Colonel Lethbridge-Stewart, respectively.

No. story	No. in season	Serial title	Episode titles	Directed by	Written by	Original release date	Prod. code	UK viewers (millions)	AI
37	1	The Tomb of the Cybermen	"Episode 1"	Morris Barry	Kit Pedler and Gerry Davis	2 September 1967	MM	6.0	53
37	1	The Tomb of the Cybermen	"Episode 2"	Morris Barry	Kit Pedler and Gerry Davis	9 September 1967	MM	6.4	52
37	1	The Tomb of the Cybermen	"Episode 3"	Morris Barry	Kit Pedler and Gerry Davis	16 September 1967	MM	7.2	49
37	1	The Tomb of the Cybermen	"Episode 4"	Morris Barry	Kit Pedler and Gerry Davis	23 September 1967	MM	7.4	50
38	2	The Abominable Snowmen	"Episode One"^{†}	Gerald Blake	Mervyn Haisman and Henry Lincoln	30 September 1967	NN	6.3	50
38	2	The Abominable Snowmen	"Episode Two"	Gerald Blake	Mervyn Haisman and Henry Lincoln	7 October 1967	NN	6.0	52
38	2	The Abominable Snowmen	"Episode Three"^{†}	Gerald Blake	Mervyn Haisman and Henry Lincoln	14 October 1967	NN	7.1	51
38	2	The Abominable Snowmen	"Episode Four"^{†}	Gerald Blake	Mervyn Haisman and Henry Lincoln	21 October 1967	NN	7.1	50
38	2	The Abominable Snowmen	"Episode Five"^{†}	Gerald Blake	Mervyn Haisman and Henry Lincoln	28 October 1967	NN	7.2	51
38	2	The Abominable Snowmen	"Episode Six"^{†}	Gerald Blake	Mervyn Haisman and Henry Lincoln	4 November 1967	NN	7.4	52
39	3	The Ice Warriors	"One"	Derek Martinus	Brian Hayles	11 November 1967	OO	6.7	52
39	3	The Ice Warriors	"Two"^{†}	Derek Martinus	Brian Hayles	18 November 1967	OO	7.1	52
39	3	The Ice Warriors	"Three"^{†}	Derek Martinus	Brian Hayles	25 November 1967	OO	7.4	51
39	3	The Ice Warriors	"Four"	Derek Martinus	Brian Hayles	2 December 1967	OO	7.3	51
39	3	The Ice Warriors	"Five"	Derek Martinus	Brian Hayles	9 December 1967	OO	8.0	50
39	3	The Ice Warriors	"Six"	Derek Martinus	Brian Hayles	16 December 1967	OO	7.5	51
40	4	The Enemy of the World	"Episode 1"	Barry Letts	David Whitaker	23 December 1967	PP	6.8	50
40	4	The Enemy of the World	"Episode 2"	Barry Letts	David Whitaker	30 December 1967	PP	7.6	49
40	4	The Enemy of the World	"Episode 3"	Barry Letts	David Whitaker	6 January 1968	PP	7.1	48
40	4	The Enemy of the World	"Episode 4"	Barry Letts	David Whitaker	13 January 1968	PP	7.8	49
40	4	The Enemy of the World	"Episode 5"	Barry Letts	David Whitaker	20 January 1968	PP	6.9	49
40	4	The Enemy of the World	"Episode 6"	Barry Letts	David Whitaker	27 January 1968	PP	8.3	52
41	5	The Web of Fear	"Episode 1"	Douglas Camfield	Mervyn Haisman and Henry Lincoln	3 February 1968	QQ	7.2	54
41	5	The Web of Fear	"Episode 2"	Douglas Camfield	Mervyn Haisman and Henry Lincoln	10 February 1968	QQ	6.8	53
41	5	The Web of Fear	"Episode 3"^{†}	Douglas Camfield	Mervyn Haisman and Henry Lincoln	17 February 1968	QQ	7.0	51
41	5	The Web of Fear	"Episode 4"	Douglas Camfield	Mervyn Haisman and Henry Lincoln	24 February 1968	QQ	8.4	53
41	5	The Web of Fear	"Episode 5"	Douglas Camfield	Mervyn Haisman and Henry Lincoln	2 March 1968	QQ	8.0	55
41	5	The Web of Fear	"Episode 6"	Douglas Camfield	Mervyn Haisman and Henry Lincoln	9 March 1968	QQ	8.3	55
42	6	Fury from the Deep	"Episode 1"^{†}	Hugh David	Victor Pemberton	16 March 1968	RR	8.2	55
42	6	Fury from the Deep	"Episode 2"^{†}	Hugh David	Victor Pemberton	23 March 1968	RR	7.9	55
42	6	Fury from the Deep	"Episode 3"^{†}	Hugh David	Victor Pemberton	30 March 1968	RR	7.7	56
42	6	Fury from the Deep	"Episode 4"^{†}	Hugh David	Victor Pemberton	6 April 1968	RR	6.6	56
42	6	Fury from the Deep	"Episode 5"^{†}	Hugh David	Victor Pemberton	13 April 1968	RR	5.9	56
42	6	Fury from the Deep	"Episode 6"^{†}	Hugh David	Victor Pemberton	20 April 1968	RR	6.9	57
43	7	The Wheel in Space	"Episode 1"^{†}	Tristan DeVere Cole	David Whitaker and Kit Pedler (story)	27 April 1968	SS	7.2	57
43	7	The Wheel in Space	"Episode 2"^{†}	Tristan DeVere Cole	David Whitaker and Kit Pedler (story)	4 May 1968	SS	6.9	60
43	7	The Wheel in Space	"Episode 3"	Tristan DeVere Cole	David Whitaker and Kit Pedler (story)	11 May 1968	SS	7.5	55
43	7	The Wheel in Space	"Episode 4"^{†}	Tristan DeVere Cole	David Whitaker and Kit Pedler (story)	18 May 1968	SS	8.6	56
43	7	The Wheel in Space	"Episode 5"^{†}	Tristan DeVere Cole	David Whitaker and Kit Pedler (story)	25 May 1968	SS	6.8	57
43	7	The Wheel in Space	"Episode 6"	Tristan DeVere Cole	David Whitaker and Kit Pedler (story)	1 June 1968	SS	6.5	62

^†: Episode is missing

==== Season 6 (1968–1969) ====
Hines and Padbury both departed in The War Games, alongside Troughton. It was the show's last season to be filmed in black and white.

No. story	No. in season	Serial title	Episode titles	Directed by	Written by	Original release date	Prod. code	UK viewers (millions)	AI
44	1	The Dominators	"Episode 1"	Morris Barry	"Norman Ashby" (Mervyn Haisman and Henry Lincoln)	10 August 1968	TT	6.1	52
44	1	The Dominators	"Episode 2"	Morris Barry	"Norman Ashby" (Mervyn Haisman and Henry Lincoln)	17 August 1968	TT	5.9	55
44	1	The Dominators	[Episode 3] (Note: This episode has no on-screen episode title.)	Morris Barry	"Norman Ashby" (Mervyn Haisman and Henry Lincoln)	24 August 1968	TT	5.4	55
44	1	The Dominators	"Episode 4"	Morris Barry	"Norman Ashby" (Mervyn Haisman and Henry Lincoln)	31 August 1968	TT	7.5	51
44	1	The Dominators	"Episode 5"	Morris Barry	"Norman Ashby" (Mervyn Haisman and Henry Lincoln)	7 September 1968	TT	5.9	53
45	2	The Mind Robber	"Episode 1"	David Maloney	Derrick Sherwin (uncredited)	14 September 1968	UU	6.6	51
45	2	The Mind Robber	"Episode 2"	David Maloney	Peter Ling	21 September 1968	UU	6.5	49
45	2	The Mind Robber	"Episode 3"	David Maloney	Peter Ling	28 September 1968	UU	7.2	53
45	2	The Mind Robber	"Episode 4"	David Maloney	Peter Ling	5 October 1968	UU	7.3	56
45	2	The Mind Robber	"Episode 5"	David Maloney	Peter Ling	12 October 1968	UU	6.7	49
46	3	The Invasion	"Episode One"^{†}	Douglas Camfield	Derrick Sherwin and Kit Pedler (story)	2 November 1968	VV	7.3	55
46	3	The Invasion	"Episode Two"	Douglas Camfield	Derrick Sherwin and Kit Pedler (story)	9 November 1968	VV	7.1	53
46	3	The Invasion	"Episode Three"	Douglas Camfield	Derrick Sherwin and Kit Pedler (story)	16 November 1968	VV	7.1	54
46	3	The Invasion	"Episode Four"^{†}	Douglas Camfield	Derrick Sherwin and Kit Pedler (story)	23 November 1968	VV	6.4	51
46	3	The Invasion	"Episode Five"	Douglas Camfield	Derrick Sherwin and Kit Pedler (story)	30 November 1968	VV	6.7	52
46	3	The Invasion	"Episode Six"	Douglas Camfield	Derrick Sherwin and Kit Pedler (story)	7 December 1968	VV	6.5	56
46	3	The Invasion	"Episode Seven"	Douglas Camfield	Derrick Sherwin and Kit Pedler (story)	14 December 1968	VV	7.2	55
46	3	The Invasion	"Episode Eight"	Douglas Camfield	Derrick Sherwin and Kit Pedler (story)	21 December 1968	VV	7.0	53
47	4	The Krotons	"Episode One"	David Maloney	Robert Holmes	28 December 1968	WW	9.0	59
47	4	The Krotons	"Episode Two"	David Maloney	Robert Holmes	4 January 1969	WW	8.4	57
47	4	The Krotons	"Episode Three"	David Maloney	Robert Holmes	11 January 1969	WW	7.5	56
47	4	The Krotons	"Episode Four"	David Maloney	Robert Holmes	18 January 1969	WW	7.1	55
48	5	The Seeds of Death	"Episode One"	Michael Ferguson	Brian Hayles	25 January 1969	XX	6.6	57
48	5	The Seeds of Death	"Episode Two"	Michael Ferguson	Brian Hayles	1 February 1969	XX	6.8	59
48	5	The Seeds of Death	"Episode Three"	Michael Ferguson	Brian Hayles and Terrance Dicks (uncredited)	8 February 1969	XX	7.5	55
48	5	The Seeds of Death	"Episode Four"	Michael Ferguson	Brian Hayles and Terrance Dicks (uncredited)	15 February 1969	XX	7.1	55
48	5	The Seeds of Death	"Episode Five"	Michael Ferguson	Brian Hayles and Terrance Dicks (uncredited)	22 February 1969	XX	7.6	57
48	5	The Seeds of Death	"Episode Six"	Michael Ferguson	Brian Hayles and Terrance Dicks (uncredited)	1 March 1969	XX	7.7	59
49	6	The Space Pirates	"Episode One"^{†}	Michael Hart	Robert Holmes	8 March 1969	YY	5.8	57
49	6	The Space Pirates	"Episode Two"	Michael Hart	Robert Holmes	15 March 1969	YY	6.8	52
49	6	The Space Pirates	"Episode Three"^{†}	Michael Hart	Robert Holmes	22 March 1969	YY	6.4	55
49	6	The Space Pirates	"Episode Four"^{†}	Michael Hart	Robert Holmes	29 March 1969	YY	5.8	53
49	6	The Space Pirates	"Episode Five"^{†}	Michael Hart	Robert Holmes	5 April 1969	YY	5.5	56
49	6	The Space Pirates	"Episode Six"^{†}	Michael Hart	Robert Holmes	12 April 1969	YY	5.3	52
50	7	The War Games	"Episode One"	David Maloney	Terrance Dicks and Malcolm Hulke	19 April 1969	ZZ	5.5	55
50	7	The War Games	"Episode Two"	David Maloney	Terrance Dicks and Malcolm Hulke	26 April 1969	ZZ	6.3	54
50	7	The War Games	"Episode Three"	David Maloney	Terrance Dicks and Malcolm Hulke	3 May 1969	ZZ	5.1	53
50	7	The War Games	"Episode Four"	David Maloney	Terrance Dicks and Malcolm Hulke	10 May 1969	ZZ	5.7	50
50	7	The War Games	"Episode Five"	David Maloney	Terrance Dicks and Malcolm Hulke	17 May 1969	ZZ	5.1	53
50	7	The War Games	"Episode Six"	David Maloney	Terrance Dicks and Malcolm Hulke	24 May 1969	ZZ	4.2	53
50	7	The War Games	"Episode Seven"	David Maloney	Terrance Dicks and Malcolm Hulke	31 May 1969	ZZ	4.9	53
50	7	The War Games	"Episode Eight"	David Maloney	Terrance Dicks and Malcolm Hulke	7 June 1969	ZZ	3.5	53
50	7	The War Games	"Episode Nine"	David Maloney	Terrance Dicks and Malcolm Hulke	14 June 1969	ZZ	4.1	57
50	7	The War Games	"Episode Ten"	David Maloney	Terrance Dicks and Malcolm Hulke	21 June 1969	ZZ	5.0	58

^†: Episode is missing

=== Third Doctor ===
The Third Doctor was portrayed by Jon Pertwee. Sentenced to exile on Earth and forcibly regenerated at the end of The War Games, the Doctor spent his time working for UNIT (United Nations Intelligence Taskforce). After The Three Doctors, the Time Lords repealed his exile; nevertheless, the Doctor still worked closely with UNIT from time to time. The Third Doctor regenerated into his fourth incarnation as a result of radiation poisoning in the last moments of Planet of the Spiders.

==== Season 7 (1970) ====
From this season onwards the programme was produced in colour. To accommodate the new production methods the number of episodes in a season was cut: season 6 has 44 episodes; season 7 has 25 episodes. The seasons continued to have between 20 and 28 episodes until season 22. This season featured companion Liz Shaw played by Caroline John.

No. story	No. in season	Serial title	Episode titles	Directed by	Written by	Original release date	Prod. code	UK viewers (millions)	AI
51	1	Spearhead from Space	"Episode 1"	Derek Martinus	Robert Holmes	3 January 1970	AAA	8.4	54
51	1	Spearhead from Space	"Episode 2"	Derek Martinus	Robert Holmes	10 January 1970	AAA	8.1	—
51	1	Spearhead from Space	"Episode 3"	Derek Martinus	Robert Holmes	17 January 1970	AAA	8.3	—
51	1	Spearhead from Space	"Episode 4"	Derek Martinus	Robert Holmes	24 January 1970	AAA	8.1	57
52	2	Doctor Who and the Silurians	"Episode 1"	Timothy Combe	Malcolm Hulke	31 January 1970	BBB	8.8	58
52	2	Doctor Who and the Silurians	"Episode 2"	Timothy Combe	Malcolm Hulke	7 February 1970	BBB	7.3	58
52	2	Doctor Who and the Silurians	"Episode 3"	Timothy Combe	Malcolm Hulke	14 February 1970	BBB	7.5	57
52	2	Doctor Who and the Silurians	"Episode 4"	Timothy Combe	Malcolm Hulke	21 February 1970	BBB	8.2	60
52	2	Doctor Who and the Silurians	"Episode 5"	Timothy Combe	Malcolm Hulke	28 February 1970	BBB	7.5	58
52	2	Doctor Who and the Silurians	"Episode 6"	Timothy Combe	Malcolm Hulke	7 March 1970	BBB	7.2	57
52	2	Doctor Who and the Silurians	"Episode 7"	Timothy Combe	Malcolm Hulke	14 March 1970	BBB	7.5	58
53	3	The Ambassadors of Death	"Episode 1"	Michael Ferguson	David Whitaker and Trevor Ray (uncredited)	21 March 1970	CCC	7.1	60
53	3	The Ambassadors of Death	"Episode 2"	Michael Ferguson	David Whitaker and Malcolm Hulke (uncredited)	28 March 1970	CCC	7.6	61
53	3	The Ambassadors of Death	"Episode 3"	Michael Ferguson	David Whitaker and Malcolm Hulke (uncredited)	4 April 1970	CCC	8.0	59
53	3	The Ambassadors of Death	"Episode 4"	Michael Ferguson	Malcolm Hulke (credited to David Whitaker)	11 April 1970	CCC	9.3	58
53	3	The Ambassadors of Death	"Episode 5"	Michael Ferguson	Malcolm Hulke (credited to David Whitaker)	18 April 1970	CCC	7.1	—
53	3	The Ambassadors of Death	"Episode 6"	Michael Ferguson	Malcolm Hulke (credited to David Whitaker)	25 April 1970	CCC	6.9	61
53	3	The Ambassadors of Death	"Episode 7"	Michael Ferguson	Malcolm Hulke (credited to David Whitaker)	2 May 1970	CCC	6.4	62
54	4	Inferno	"Episode 1"	Douglas Camfield	Don Houghton	9 May 1970	DDD	5.7	61
54	4	Inferno	"Episode 2"	Douglas Camfield	Don Houghton	16 May 1970	DDD	5.9	61
54	4	Inferno	"Episode 3"	Douglas Camfield and Barry Letts (uncredited)	Don Houghton	23 May 1970	DDD	4.8	60
54	4	Inferno	"Episode 4"	Douglas Camfield and Barry Letts (uncredited)	Don Houghton	30 May 1970	DDD	6.0	60
54	4	Inferno	"Episode 5"	Douglas Camfield and Barry Letts (uncredited)	Don Houghton	6 June 1970	DDD	5.4	—
54	4	Inferno	"Episode 6"	Douglas Camfield and Barry Letts (uncredited)	Don Houghton	13 June 1970	DDD	6.7	58
54	4	Inferno	"Episode 7"	Douglas Camfield and Barry Letts (uncredited)	Don Houghton	20 June 1970	DDD	5.5	60

==== Season 8 (1971) ====
This season forms a loose arc with the introduction of the Master, the villain in each of the season's storylines, and introduces the companion Jo Grant portrayed by Katy Manning.

No. story	No. in season	Serial title	Episode titles	Directed by	Written by	Original release date	Prod. code	UK viewers (millions)	AI
55	1	Terror of the Autons	"Episode One"	Barry Letts	Robert Holmes	2 January 1971	EEE	7.3	—
55	1	Terror of the Autons	"Episode Two"	Barry Letts	Robert Holmes	9 January 1971	EEE	8.0	—
55	1	Terror of the Autons	"Episode Three"	Barry Letts	Robert Holmes	16 January 1971	EEE	8.1	—
55	1	Terror of the Autons	"Episode Four"	Barry Letts	Robert Holmes	23 January 1971	EEE	8.4	—
56	2	The Mind of Evil	"Episode One"	Timothy Combe	Don Houghton	30 January 1971	FFF	6.1	—
56	2	The Mind of Evil	"Episode Two"	Timothy Combe	Don Houghton	6 February 1971	FFF	8.8	—
56	2	The Mind of Evil	"Episode Three"	Timothy Combe	Don Houghton	13 February 1971	FFF	7.5	—
56	2	The Mind of Evil	"Episode Four"	Timothy Combe	Don Houghton	20 February 1971	FFF	7.4	—
56	2	The Mind of Evil	"Episode Five"	Timothy Combe	Don Houghton	27 February 1971	FFF	7.6	—
56	2	The Mind of Evil	"Episode Six"	Timothy Combe	Don Houghton	6 March 1971	FFF	7.3	—
57	3	The Claws of Axos	"Episode One"	Michael Ferguson	Bob Baker and Dave Martin	13 March 1971	GGG	7.3	—
57	3	The Claws of Axos	"Episode Two"	Michael Ferguson	Bob Baker and Dave Martin	20 March 1971	GGG	8.0	—
57	3	The Claws of Axos	"Episode Three"	Michael Ferguson	Bob Baker and Dave Martin	27 March 1971	GGG	6.4	—
57	3	The Claws of Axos	"Episode Four"	Michael Ferguson	Bob Baker and Dave Martin	3 April 1971	GGG	7.8	—
58	4	Colony in Space	"Episode One"	Michael E. Briant	Malcolm Hulke	10 April 1971	HHH	7.6	—
58	4	Colony in Space	"Episode Two"	Michael E. Briant	Malcolm Hulke	17 April 1971	HHH	8.5	—
58	4	Colony in Space	"Episode Three"	Michael E. Briant	Malcolm Hulke	24 April 1971	HHH	9.5	—
58	4	Colony in Space	"Episode Four"	Michael E. Briant	Malcolm Hulke	1 May 1971	HHH	8.1	—
58	4	Colony in Space	"Episode Five"	Michael E. Briant	Malcolm Hulke	8 May 1971	HHH	8.8	—
58	4	Colony in Space	"Episode Six"	Michael E. Briant	Malcolm Hulke	15 May 1971	HHH	8.7	—
59	5	The Dæmons	"Episode One"	Christopher Barry	Guy Leopold (Robert Sloman and Barry Letts)	22 May 1971	JJJ	9.2	—
59	5	The Dæmons	"Episode Two"	Christopher Barry	Guy Leopold (Robert Sloman and Barry Letts)	29 May 1971	JJJ	8.0	—
59	5	The Dæmons	"Episode Three"	Christopher Barry	Guy Leopold (Robert Sloman and Barry Letts)	5 June 1971	JJJ	8.1	—
59	5	The Dæmons	"Episode Four"	Christopher Barry	Guy Leopold (Robert Sloman and Barry Letts)	12 June 1971	JJJ	8.1	—
59	5	The Dæmons	"Episode Five"	Christopher Barry	Guy Leopold (Robert Sloman and Barry Letts)	19 June 1971	JJJ	8.3	—

==== Season 9 (1972) ====
No. story	No. in season	Serial title	Episode titles	Directed by	Written by	Original release date	Prod. code	UK viewers (millions)	AI
60	1	Day of the Daleks	"Episode One"	Paul Bernard	Louis Marks	1 January 1972	KKK	9.8	—
60	1	Day of the Daleks	"Episode Two"	Paul Bernard	Louis Marks	8 January 1972	KKK	10.4	—
60	1	Day of the Daleks	"Episode Three"	Paul Bernard	Louis Marks	15 January 1972	KKK	9.1	—
60	1	Day of the Daleks	"Episode Four"	Paul Bernard	Louis Marks	22 January 1972	KKK	9.1	—
61	2	The Curse of Peladon	"Episode One"	Lennie Mayne	Brian Hayles	29 January 1972	MMM	10.3	—
61	2	The Curse of Peladon	"Episode Two"	Lennie Mayne	Brian Hayles	5 February 1972	MMM	11.0	—
61	2	The Curse of Peladon	"Episode Three"	Lennie Mayne	Brian Hayles	12 February 1972	MMM	7.8	—
61	2	The Curse of Peladon	"Episode Four"	Lennie Mayne	Brian Hayles	19 February 1972	MMM	8.4	—
62	3	The Sea Devils	"Episode One"	Michael E. Briant	Malcolm Hulke	26 February 1972	LLL	6.4	—
62	3	The Sea Devils	"Episode Two"	Michael E. Briant	Malcolm Hulke	4 March 1972	LLL	9.7	—
62	3	The Sea Devils	"Episode Three"	Michael E. Briant	Malcolm Hulke	11 March 1972	LLL	8.3	—
62	3	The Sea Devils	"Episode Four"	Michael E. Briant	Malcolm Hulke	18 March 1972	LLL	7.8	—
62	3	The Sea Devils	"Episode Five"	Michael E. Briant	Malcolm Hulke	25 March 1972	LLL	8.3	—
62	3	The Sea Devils	"Episode Six"	Michael E. Briant	Malcolm Hulke	1 April 1972	LLL	8.5	—
63	4	The Mutants	"Episode One"	Christopher Barry	Bob Baker and Dave Martin	8 April 1972	NNN	9.1	—
63	4	The Mutants	"Episode Two"	Christopher Barry	Bob Baker and Dave Martin	15 April 1972	NNN	7.8	—
63	4	The Mutants	"Episode Three"	Christopher Barry	Bob Baker and Dave Martin	22 April 1972	NNN	7.9	—
63	4	The Mutants	"Episode Four"	Christopher Barry	Bob Baker and Dave Martin	29 April 1972	NNN	7.5	—
63	4	The Mutants	"Episode Five"	Christopher Barry	Bob Baker and Dave Martin	6 May 1972	NNN	7.9	—
63	4	The Mutants	"Episode Six"	Christopher Barry	Bob Baker and Dave Martin	13 May 1972	NNN	6.5	—
64	5	The Time Monster	"Episode One"	Paul Bernard	Robert Sloman and Barry Letts (uncredited)	20 May 1972	OOO	7.6	—
64	5	The Time Monster	"Episode Two"	Paul Bernard	Robert Sloman and Barry Letts (uncredited)	27 May 1972	OOO	7.4	—
64	5	The Time Monster	"Episode Three"	Paul Bernard	Robert Sloman and Barry Letts (uncredited)	3 June 1972	OOO	8.1	—
64	5	The Time Monster	"Episode Four"	Paul Bernard	Robert Sloman and Barry Letts (uncredited)	10 June 1972	OOO	7.6	—
64	5	The Time Monster	"Episode Five"	Paul Bernard	Robert Sloman and Barry Letts (uncredited)	17 June 1972	OOO	6.0	—
64	5	The Time Monster	"Episode Six"	Paul Bernard	Robert Sloman and Barry Letts (uncredited)	24 June 1972	OOO	7.6	—

==== Season 10 (1972–1973) ====
This season marked the final appearance of companion Jo Grant and the end of the Doctor's exile on Earth.

No. story	No. in season	Serial title	Episode titles	Directed by	Written by	Original release date	Prod. code	UK viewers (millions)	AI
65	1	The Three Doctors	"Episode One"	Lennie Mayne	Bob Baker and Dave Martin	30 December 1972	RRR	9.6	—
65	1	The Three Doctors	"Episode Two"	Lennie Mayne	Bob Baker and Dave Martin	6 January 1973	RRR	10.8	—
65	1	The Three Doctors	"Episode Three"	Lennie Mayne	Bob Baker and Dave Martin	13 January 1973	RRR	8.8	—
65	1	The Three Doctors	"Episode Four"	Lennie Mayne	Bob Baker and Dave Martin	20 January 1973	RRR	11.9	—
66	2	Carnival of Monsters	"Episode One"	Barry Letts	Robert Holmes	27 January 1973	PPP	9.5	—
66	2	Carnival of Monsters	"Episode Two"	Barry Letts	Robert Holmes	3 February 1973	PPP	9.0	—
66	2	Carnival of Monsters	"Episode Three"	Barry Letts	Robert Holmes	10 February 1973	PPP	9.0	—
66	2	Carnival of Monsters	"Episode Four"	Barry Letts	Robert Holmes	17 February 1973	PPP	9.2	—
67	3	Frontier in Space	"Episode One"	Paul Bernard	Malcolm Hulke	24 February 1973	QQQ	9.1	—
67	3	Frontier in Space	"Episode Two"	Paul Bernard	Malcolm Hulke	3 March 1973	QQQ	7.8	—
67	3	Frontier in Space	"Episode Three"	Paul Bernard	Malcolm Hulke	10 March 1973	QQQ	7.5	—
67	3	Frontier in Space	"Episode Four"	Paul Bernard	Malcolm Hulke	17 March 1973	QQQ	7.1	—
67	3	Frontier in Space	"Episode Five"	Paul Bernard	Malcolm Hulke	24 March 1973	QQQ	7.7	—
67	3	Frontier in Space	"Episode Six"	Paul Bernard	Malcolm Hulke	31 March 1973	QQQ	8.9	—
68	4	Planet of the Daleks	"Episode One"	David Maloney	Terry Nation	7 April 1973	SSS	11.0	—
68	4	Planet of the Daleks	"Episode Two"	David Maloney	Terry Nation	14 April 1973	SSS	10.7	—
68	4	Planet of the Daleks	"Episode Three"	David Maloney	Terry Nation	21 April 1973	SSS	10.1	—
68	4	Planet of the Daleks	"Episode Four"	David Maloney	Terry Nation	28 April 1973	SSS	8.3	—
68	4	Planet of the Daleks	"Episode Five"	David Maloney	Terry Nation	5 May 1973	SSS	9.7	—
68	4	Planet of the Daleks	"Episode Six"	David Maloney	Terry Nation	12 May 1973	SSS	8.5	—
69	5	The Green Death	"Episode One"	Michael E. Briant	Robert Sloman and Barry Letts (uncredited)	19 May 1973	TTT	9.2	—
69	5	The Green Death	"Episode Two"	Michael E. Briant	Robert Sloman and Barry Letts (uncredited)	26 May 1973	TTT	7.2	—
69	5	The Green Death	"Episode Three"	Michael E. Briant	Robert Sloman and Barry Letts (uncredited)	2 June 1973	TTT	7.8	—
69	5	The Green Death	"Episode Four"	Michael E. Briant	Robert Sloman and Barry Letts (uncredited)	9 June 1973	TTT	6.8	—
69	5	The Green Death	"Episode Five"	Michael E. Briant	Robert Sloman and Barry Letts (uncredited)	16 June 1973	TTT	8.3	—
69	5	The Green Death	"Episode Six"	Michael E. Briant	Robert Sloman and Barry Letts (uncredited)	23 June 1973	TTT	7.0	—

==== Season 11 (1973–1974) ====
This season introduces the companion Sarah Jane Smith portrayed by Elisabeth Sladen.

No. story	No. in season	Serial title	Episode titles	Directed by	Written by	Original release date	Prod. code	UK viewers (millions)	AI
70	1	The Time Warrior	"Part One"	Alan Bromly	Robert Holmes	15 December 1973	UUU	8.7	59
70	1	The Time Warrior	"Part Two"	Alan Bromly	Robert Holmes	22 December 1973	UUU	7.0	—
70	1	The Time Warrior	"Part Three"	Alan Bromly	Robert Holmes	29 December 1973	UUU	6.6	—
70	1	The Time Warrior	"Part Four"	Alan Bromly	Robert Holmes	5 January 1974	UUU	10.6	60
71	2	Invasion of the Dinosaurs	"Part One"	Paddy Russell	Malcolm Hulke	12 January 1974	WWW	11.0	62
71	2	Invasion of the Dinosaurs	"Part Two"	Paddy Russell	Malcolm Hulke	19 January 1974	WWW	10.1	—
71	2	Invasion of the Dinosaurs	"Part Three"	Paddy Russell	Malcolm Hulke	26 January 1974	WWW	11.0	63
71	2	Invasion of the Dinosaurs	"Part Four"	Paddy Russell	Malcolm Hulke	2 February 1974	WWW	9.0	—
71	2	Invasion of the Dinosaurs	"Part Five"	Paddy Russell	Malcolm Hulke	9 February 1974	WWW	9.0	—
71	2	Invasion of the Dinosaurs	"Part Six"	Paddy Russell	Malcolm Hulke	16 February 1974	WWW	7.5	62
72	3	Death to the Daleks	"Part One"	Michael E. Briant	Terry Nation	23 February 1974	XXX	8.1	61
72	3	Death to the Daleks	"Part Two"	Michael E. Briant	Terry Nation	2 March 1974	XXX	9.5	—
72	3	Death to the Daleks	"Part Three"	Michael E. Briant	Terry Nation	9 March 1974	XXX	10.5	61
72	3	Death to the Daleks	"Part Four"	Michael E. Briant	Terry Nation	16 March 1974	XXX	9.5	62
73	4	The Monster of Peladon	"Part One"	Lennie Mayne	Brian Hayles	23 March 1974	YYY	9.2	—
73	4	The Monster of Peladon	"Part Two"	Lennie Mayne	Brian Hayles	30 March 1974	YYY	6.8	—
73	4	The Monster of Peladon	"Part Three"	Lennie Mayne	Brian Hayles	6 April 1974	YYY	7.4	64
73	4	The Monster of Peladon	"Part Four"	Lennie Mayne	Brian Hayles	13 April 1974	YYY	7.2	—
73	4	The Monster of Peladon	"Part Five"	Lennie Mayne	Brian Hayles	20 April 1974	YYY	7.5	—
73	4	The Monster of Peladon	"Part Six"	Lennie Mayne	Brian Hayles	27 April 1974	YYY	8.1	—
74	5	Planet of the Spiders	"Part One"	Barry Letts	Robert Sloman and Barry Letts (uncredited)	4 May 1974	ZZZ	10.1	58
74	5	Planet of the Spiders	"Part Two"	Barry Letts	Robert Sloman and Barry Letts (uncredited)	11 May 1974	ZZZ	8.9	60
74	5	Planet of the Spiders	"Part Three"	Barry Letts	Robert Sloman and Barry Letts (uncredited)	18 May 1974	ZZZ	8.8	57
74	5	Planet of the Spiders	"Part Four"	Barry Letts	Robert Sloman and Barry Letts (uncredited)	25 May 1974	ZZZ	8.2	—
74	5	Planet of the Spiders	"Part Five"	Barry Letts	Robert Sloman and Barry Letts (uncredited)	1 June 1974	ZZZ	9.2	—
74	5	Planet of the Spiders	"Part Six"	Barry Letts	Robert Sloman and Barry Letts (uncredited)	8 June 1974	ZZZ	8.9	56

=== Fourth Doctor ===
The Fourth Doctor was portrayed by Tom Baker. Baker held the role for seven years, the longest of any actor, departing in 1981 due to disputes with producer John Nathan-Turner.

==== Season 12 (1974–1975) ====
All serials in this season continue directly one after the other, tracing one single problematic voyage of the TARDIS crew. Despite the continuity, each serial is considered its own standalone story. This season also introduced the character of Harry Sullivan portrayed by Ian Marter as a companion; this character was intended to undertake action scenes, during the period prior to Tom Baker being cast, when it was unclear how old the actor playing the new Doctor would be.

No. story	No. in season	Serial title	Episode titles	Directed by	Written by	Original release date	Prod. code	UK viewers (millions)	AI
75	1	Robot	"Part One"	Christopher Barry	Terrance Dicks	28 December 1974	4A	10.8	53
75	1	Robot	"Part Two"	Christopher Barry	Terrance Dicks	4 January 1975	4A	10.7	53
75	1	Robot	"Part Three"	Christopher Barry	Terrance Dicks	11 January 1975	4A	10.1	—
75	1	Robot	"Part Four"	Christopher Barry	Terrance Dicks	18 January 1975	4A	9.0	51
76	2	The Ark in Space	"Part One"	Rodney Bennett	Robert Holmes	25 January 1975	4C	9.4	—
76	2	The Ark in Space	"Part Two"	Rodney Bennett	Robert Holmes	1 February 1975	4C	13.6	—
76	2	The Ark in Space	"Part Three"	Rodney Bennett	Robert Holmes	8 February 1975	4C	11.2	—
76	2	The Ark in Space	"Part Four"	Rodney Bennett	Robert Holmes	15 February 1975	4C	10.2	—
77	3	The Sontaran Experiment	"Part One"	Rodney Bennett	Bob Baker and Dave Martin	22 February 1975	4B	11.0	—
77	3	The Sontaran Experiment	"Part Two"	Rodney Bennett	Bob Baker and Dave Martin	1 March 1975	4B	10.5	55
78	4	Genesis of the Daleks	"Part One"	David Maloney	Terry Nation	8 March 1975	4E	10.7	—
78	4	Genesis of the Daleks	"Part Two"	David Maloney	Terry Nation	15 March 1975	4E	10.5	57
78	4	Genesis of the Daleks	"Part Three"	David Maloney	Terry Nation	22 March 1975	4E	8.5	—
78	4	Genesis of the Daleks	"Part Four"	David Maloney	Terry Nation	29 March 1975	4E	8.8	58
78	4	Genesis of the Daleks	"Part Five"	David Maloney	Terry Nation	5 April 1975	4E	9.8	57
78	4	Genesis of the Daleks	"Part Six"	David Maloney	Terry Nation	12 April 1975	4E	9.1	56
79	5	Revenge of the Cybermen	"Part One"	Michael E. Briant	Gerry Davis	19 April 1975	4D	9.5	57
79	5	Revenge of the Cybermen	"Part Two"	Michael E. Briant	Gerry Davis	26 April 1975	4D	8.3	—
79	5	Revenge of the Cybermen	"Part Three"	Michael E. Briant	Gerry Davis	3 May 1975	4D	8.9	—
79	5	Revenge of the Cybermen	"Part Four"	Michael E. Briant	Gerry Davis	10 May 1975	4D	9.4	58

==== Season 13 (1975–1976) ====
During this season, Ian Marter (Harry Sullivan) left after Terror of the Zygons, but returned for a guest appearance in The Android Invasion. Terror of the Zygons also saw the last semi-regular appearance of Nicholas Courtney (Brigadier Lethbridge-Stewart) who did not return until Season 20 in Mawdryn Undead.

No. story	No. in season	Serial title	Episode titles	Directed by	Written by	Original release date	Prod. code	UK viewers (millions)	AI
80	1	Terror of the Zygons	"Part One"	Douglas Camfield	Robert Banks Stewart	30 August 1975	4F	8.4	59
80	1	Terror of the Zygons	"Part Two"	Douglas Camfield	Robert Banks Stewart	6 September 1975	4F	6.1	—
80	1	Terror of the Zygons	"Part Three"	Douglas Camfield	Robert Banks Stewart	13 September 1975	4F	8.2	54
80	1	Terror of the Zygons	"Part Four"	Douglas Camfield	Robert Banks Stewart	20 September 1975	4F	7.2	—
81	2	Planet of Evil	"Part One"	David Maloney	Louis Marks	27 September 1975	4H	10.4	56
81	2	Planet of Evil	"Part Two"	David Maloney	Louis Marks	4 October 1975	4H	9.9	56
81	2	Planet of Evil	"Part Three"	David Maloney	Louis Marks	11 October 1975	4H	9.1	57
81	2	Planet of Evil	"Part Four"	David Maloney	Louis Marks	18 October 1975	4H	10.1	54
82	3	Pyramids of Mars	"Part One"	Paddy Russell	"Stephen Harris" (Lewis Greifer and Robert Holmes)	25 October 1975	4G	10.5	—
82	3	Pyramids of Mars	"Part Two"	Paddy Russell	"Stephen Harris" (Lewis Greifer and Robert Holmes)	1 November 1975	4G	11.3	—
82	3	Pyramids of Mars	"Part Three"	Paddy Russell	"Stephen Harris" (Lewis Greifer and Robert Holmes)	8 November 1975	4G	9.4	—
82	3	Pyramids of Mars	"Part Four"	Paddy Russell	"Stephen Harris" (Lewis Greifer and Robert Holmes)	15 November 1975	4G	11.7	60
83	4	The Android Invasion	"Part One"	Barry Letts	Terry Nation	22 November 1975	4J	11.9	58
83	4	The Android Invasion	"Part Two"	Barry Letts	Terry Nation	29 November 1975	4J	11.3	—
83	4	The Android Invasion	"Part Three"	Barry Letts	Terry Nation	6 December 1975	4J	12.1	—
83	4	The Android Invasion	"Part Four"	Barry Letts	Terry Nation	13 December 1975	4J	11.4	—
84	5	The Brain of Morbius	"Part One"	Christopher Barry	"Robin Bland" (Terrance Dicks and Robert Holmes)	3 January 1976	4K	9.5	—
84	5	The Brain of Morbius	"Part Two"	Christopher Barry	"Robin Bland" (Terrance Dicks and Robert Holmes)	10 January 1976	4K	9.3	—
84	5	The Brain of Morbius	"Part Three"	Christopher Barry	"Robin Bland" (Terrance Dicks and Robert Holmes)	17 January 1976	4K	10.1	57
84	5	The Brain of Morbius	"Part Four"	Christopher Barry	"Robin Bland" (Terrance Dicks and Robert Holmes)	24 January 1976	4K	10.2	—
85	6	The Seeds of Doom	"Part One"	Douglas Camfield	Robert Banks Stewart	31 January 1976	4L	11.4	59
85	6	The Seeds of Doom	"Part Two"	Douglas Camfield	Robert Banks Stewart	7 February 1976	4L	11.4	—
85	6	The Seeds of Doom	"Part Three"	Douglas Camfield	Robert Banks Stewart	14 February 1976	4L	10.3	—
85	6	The Seeds of Doom	"Part Four"	Douglas Camfield	Robert Banks Stewart	21 February 1976	4L	11.1	—
85	6	The Seeds of Doom	"Part Five"	Douglas Camfield	Robert Banks Stewart	28 February 1976	4L	9.9	—
85	6	The Seeds of Doom	"Part Six"	Douglas Camfield	Robert Banks Stewart	6 March 1976	4L	11.5	—

==== Season 14 (1976–1977) ====
Elisabeth Sladen (Sarah Jane Smith) left the series this season in The Hand of Fear and was replaced by Louise Jameson (Leela) in The Face of Evil. The season also saw the first story in which the Doctor did not have a companion, The Deadly Assassin.

No. story	No. in season	Serial title	Episode titles	Directed by	Written by	Original release date	Prod. code	UK viewers (millions)	AI
86	1	The Masque of Mandragora	"Part One"	Rodney Bennett	Louis Marks	4 September 1976	4M	8.3	58
86	1	The Masque of Mandragora	"Part Two"	Rodney Bennett	Louis Marks	11 September 1976	4M	9.8	56
86	1	The Masque of Mandragora	"Part Three"	Rodney Bennett	Louis Marks	18 September 1976	4M	9.2	—
86	1	The Masque of Mandragora	"Part Four"	Rodney Bennett	Louis Marks	25 September 1976	4M	10.6	56
87	2	The Hand of Fear	"Part One"	Lennie Mayne	Bob Baker and Dave Martin	2 October 1976	4N	10.5	—
87	2	The Hand of Fear	"Part Two"	Lennie Mayne	Bob Baker and Dave Martin	9 October 1976	4N	10.2	—
87	2	The Hand of Fear	"Part Three"	Lennie Mayne	Bob Baker and Dave Martin	16 October 1976	4N	11.1	62
87	2	The Hand of Fear	"Part Four"	Lennie Mayne	Bob Baker and Dave Martin	23 October 1976	4N	12.0	—
88	3	The Deadly Assassin	"Part One"	David Maloney	Robert Holmes	30 October 1976	4P	11.8	—
88	3	The Deadly Assassin	"Part Two"	David Maloney	Robert Holmes	6 November 1976	4P	12.1	59
88	3	The Deadly Assassin	"Part Three"	David Maloney	Robert Holmes	13 November 1976	4P	13.0	—
88	3	The Deadly Assassin	"Part Four"	David Maloney	Robert Holmes	20 November 1976	4P	11.8	61
89	4	The Face of Evil	"Part One"	Pennant Roberts	Chris Boucher	1 January 1977	4Q	10.7	61
89	4	The Face of Evil	"Part Two"	Pennant Roberts	Chris Boucher	8 January 1977	4Q	11.1	—
89	4	The Face of Evil	"Part Three"	Pennant Roberts	Chris Boucher	15 January 1977	4Q	11.3	59
89	4	The Face of Evil	"Part Four"	Pennant Roberts	Chris Boucher	22 January 1977	4Q	11.7	60
90	5	The Robots of Death	"Part One"	Michael E. Briant	Chris Boucher	29 January 1977	4R	12.8	62
90	5	The Robots of Death	"Part Two"	Michael E. Briant	Chris Boucher	5 February 1977	4R	12.4	—
90	5	The Robots of Death	"Part Three"	Michael E. Briant	Chris Boucher	12 February 1977	4R	13.1	—
90	5	The Robots of Death	"Part Four"	Michael E. Briant	Chris Boucher	19 February 1977	4R	12.6	57
91	6	The Talons of Weng-Chiang	"Part One"	David Maloney	Robert Holmes	26 February 1977	4S	11.3	—
91	6	The Talons of Weng-Chiang	"Part Two"	David Maloney	Robert Holmes	5 March 1977	4S	9.8	—
91	6	The Talons of Weng-Chiang	"Part Three"	David Maloney	Robert Holmes	12 March 1977	4S	10.2	—
91	6	The Talons of Weng-Chiang	"Part Four"	David Maloney	Robert Holmes	19 March 1977	4S	11.4	60
91	6	The Talons of Weng-Chiang	"Part Five"	David Maloney	Robert Holmes	26 March 1977	4S	10.1	—
91	6	The Talons of Weng-Chiang	"Part Six"	David Maloney	Robert Holmes	2 April 1977	4S	9.3	58

==== Season 15 (1977–1978) ====
This season saw the final appearance of Leela and the first appearance of K9 as voiced by John Leeson.

No. story	No. in season	Serial title	Episode titles	Directed by	Written by	Original release date	Prod. code	UK viewers (millions)	AI
92	1	Horror of Fang Rock	"Part One"	Paddy Russell	Terrance Dicks	3 September 1977	4V	6.8	58
92	1	Horror of Fang Rock	"Part Two"	Paddy Russell	Terrance Dicks	10 September 1977	4V	7.1	—
92	1	Horror of Fang Rock	"Part Three"	Paddy Russell	Terrance Dicks	17 September 1977	4V	9.8	60
92	1	Horror of Fang Rock	"Part Four"	Paddy Russell	Terrance Dicks	24 September 1977	4V	9.9	57
93	2	The Invisible Enemy	"Part One"	Derrick Goodwin	Bob Baker and Dave Martin	1 October 1977	4T	8.6	—
93	2	The Invisible Enemy	"Part Two"	Derrick Goodwin	Bob Baker and Dave Martin	8 October 1977	4T	7.3	—
93	2	The Invisible Enemy	"Part Three"	Derrick Goodwin	Bob Baker and Dave Martin	15 October 1977	4T	7.5	—
93	2	The Invisible Enemy	"Part Four"	Derrick Goodwin	Bob Baker and Dave Martin	22 October 1977	4T	8.3	60
94	3	Image of the Fendahl	"Part One"	George Spenton-Foster	Chris Boucher	29 October 1977	4X	6.7	—
94	3	Image of the Fendahl	"Part Two"	George Spenton-Foster	Chris Boucher	5 November 1977	4X	7.5	75
94	3	Image of the Fendahl	"Part Three"	George Spenton-Foster	Chris Boucher	12 November 1977	4X	7.9	—
94	3	Image of the Fendahl	"Part Four"	George Spenton-Foster	Chris Boucher	19 November 1977	4X	9.1	61
95	4	The Sun Makers	"Part One"	Pennant Roberts	Robert Holmes	26 November 1977	4W	8.5	—
95	4	The Sun Makers	"Part Two"	Pennant Roberts	Robert Holmes	3 December 1977	4W	9.5	62
95	4	The Sun Makers	"Part Three"	Pennant Roberts	Robert Holmes	10 December 1977	4W	8.9	68
95	4	The Sun Makers	"Part Four"	Pennant Roberts	Robert Holmes	17 December 1977	4W	8.4	59
96	5	Underworld	"Part One"	Norman Stewart	Bob Baker and Dave Martin	7 January 1978	4Y	8.9	65
96	5	Underworld	"Part Two"	Norman Stewart	Bob Baker and Dave Martin	14 January 1978	4Y	9.1	—
96	5	Underworld	"Part Three"	Norman Stewart	Bob Baker and Dave Martin	21 January 1978	4Y	8.9	—
96	5	Underworld	"Part Four"	Norman Stewart	Bob Baker and Dave Martin	28 January 1978	4Y	11.7	—
97	6	The Invasion of Time	"Part One"	Gerald Blake	"David Agnew" (Graham Williams and Anthony Read)	4 February 1978	4Z	11.2	56
97	6	The Invasion of Time	"Part Two"	Gerald Blake	"David Agnew" (Graham Williams and Anthony Read)	11 February 1978	4Z	11.4	—
97	6	The Invasion of Time	"Part Three"	Gerald Blake	"David Agnew" (Graham Williams and Anthony Read)	18 February 1978	4Z	9.5	—
97	6	The Invasion of Time	"Part Four"	Gerald Blake	"David Agnew" (Graham Williams and Anthony Read)	25 February 1978	4Z	10.9	—
97	6	The Invasion of Time	"Part Five"	Gerald Blake	"David Agnew" (Graham Williams and Anthony Read)	4 March 1978	4Z	10.3	—
97	6	The Invasion of Time	"Part Six"	Gerald Blake	"David Agnew" (Graham Williams and Anthony Read)	11 March 1978	4Z	9.8	—

==== Season 16 (1978–1979) ====
Season 16 consists of one long story arc encompassing six separate, linked stories. This season is referred to by the umbrella title The Key to Time and has been released on DVD under this title. This season introduced Mary Tamm as Romana I.

No. story	No. in season	Serial title	Episode titles	Directed by	Written by	Original release date	Prod. code	UK viewers (millions)	AI
98	1	The Ribos Operation	"Part One"	George Spenton-Foster	Robert Holmes	2 September 1978	5A	8.3	59
98	1	The Ribos Operation	"Part Two"	George Spenton-Foster	Robert Holmes	9 September 1978	5A	8.1	—
98	1	The Ribos Operation	"Part Three"	George Spenton-Foster	Robert Holmes	16 September 1978	5A	7.9	—
98	1	The Ribos Operation	"Part Four"	George Spenton-Foster	Robert Holmes	23 September 1978	5A	8.2	67
99	2	The Pirate Planet	"Part One"	Pennant Roberts	Douglas Adams	30 September 1978	5B	9.1	61
99	2	The Pirate Planet	"Part Two"	Pennant Roberts	Douglas Adams	7 October 1978	5B	7.4	—
99	2	The Pirate Planet	"Part Three"	Pennant Roberts	Douglas Adams	14 October 1978	5B	8.2	64
99	2	The Pirate Planet	"Part Four"	Pennant Roberts	Douglas Adams	21 October 1978	5B	8.4	64
100	3	The Stones of Blood	"Part One"	Darrol Blake	David Fisher	28 October 1978	5C	8.6	—
100	3	The Stones of Blood	"Part Two"	Darrol Blake	David Fisher	4 November 1978	5C	6.6	—
100	3	The Stones of Blood	"Part Three"	Darrol Blake	David Fisher	11 November 1978	5C	9.3	—
100	3	The Stones of Blood	"Part Four"	Darrol Blake	David Fisher	18 November 1978	5C	7.6	67
101	4	The Androids of Tara	"Part One"	Michael Hayes	David Fisher	25 November 1978	5D	9.5	—
101	4	The Androids of Tara	"Part Two"	Michael Hayes	David Fisher	2 December 1978	5D	10.1	65
101	4	The Androids of Tara	"Part Three"	Michael Hayes	David Fisher	9 December 1978	5D	8.9	—
101	4	The Androids of Tara	"Part Four"	Michael Hayes	David Fisher	16 December 1978	5D	9.0	66
102	5	The Power of Kroll	"Part One"	Norman Stewart	Robert Holmes	23 December 1978	5E	6.5	—
102	5	The Power of Kroll	"Part Two"	Norman Stewart	Robert Holmes	30 December 1978	5E	12.4	—
102	5	The Power of Kroll	"Part Three"	Norman Stewart	Robert Holmes	6 January 1979	5E	8.9	—
102	5	The Power of Kroll	"Part Four"	Norman Stewart	Robert Holmes	13 January 1979	5E	9.9	63
103	6	The Armageddon Factor	"Part One"	Michael Hayes	Bob Baker and Dave Martin	20 January 1979	5F	7.5	65
103	6	The Armageddon Factor	"Part Two"	Michael Hayes	Bob Baker and Dave Martin	27 January 1979	5F	8.8	—
103	6	The Armageddon Factor	"Part Three"	Michael Hayes	Bob Baker and Dave Martin	3 February 1979	5F	7.8	—
103	6	The Armageddon Factor	"Part Four"	Michael Hayes	Bob Baker and Dave Martin	10 February 1979	5F	8.6	—
103	6	The Armageddon Factor	"Part Five"	Michael Hayes	Bob Baker and Dave Martin	17 February 1979	5F	8.6	—
103	6	The Armageddon Factor	"Part Six"	Michael Hayes	Bob Baker and Dave Martin	24 February 1979	5F	9.6	66

==== Season 17 (1979–1980) ====
During this season, the role of Romana was taken over by Lalla Ward.

No. story	No. in season	Serial title	Episode titles	Directed by	Written by	Original release date	Prod. code	UK viewers (millions)	AI
104	1	Destiny of the Daleks	"Episode One"	Ken Grieve	Terry Nation	1 September 1979	5J	13.0	67
104	1	Destiny of the Daleks	"Episode Two"	Ken Grieve	Terry Nation	8 September 1979	5J	12.7	—
104	1	Destiny of the Daleks	"Episode Three"	Ken Grieve	Terry Nation	15 September 1979	5J	13.8	63
104	1	Destiny of the Daleks	"Episode Four"	Ken Grieve	Terry Nation	22 September 1979	5J	14.4	64
105	2	City of Death	"Part One"	Michael Hayes	"David Agnew" (Douglas Adams and Graham Williams, from a story by David Fisher)	29 September 1979	5H	12.4	—
105	2	City of Death	"Part Two"	Michael Hayes	"David Agnew" (Douglas Adams and Graham Williams, from a story by David Fisher)	6 October 1979	5H	14.1	64
105	2	City of Death	"Part Three"	Michael Hayes	"David Agnew" (Douglas Adams and Graham Williams, from a story by David Fisher)	13 October 1979	5H	15.4	—
105	2	City of Death	"Part Four"	Michael Hayes	"David Agnew" (Douglas Adams and Graham Williams, from a story by David Fisher)	20 October 1979	5H	16.1	64
106	3	The Creature from the Pit	"Part One"	Christopher Barry	David Fisher	27 October 1979	5G	9.3	—
106	3	The Creature from the Pit	"Part Two"	Christopher Barry	David Fisher	3 November 1979	5G	10.8	67
106	3	The Creature from the Pit	"Part Three"	Christopher Barry	David Fisher	10 November 1979	5G	10.2	—
106	3	The Creature from the Pit	"Part Four"	Christopher Barry	David Fisher	17 November 1979	5G	9.6	—
107	4	Nightmare of Eden	"Part One"	Alan Bromly	Bob Baker	24 November 1979	5K	8.7	—
107	4	Nightmare of Eden	"Part Two"	Alan Bromly	Bob Baker	1 December 1979	5K	9.6	—
107	4	Nightmare of Eden	"Part Three"	Alan Bromly	Bob Baker	8 December 1979	5K	9.6	—
107	4	Nightmare of Eden	"Part Four"	Alan Bromly	Bob Baker	15 December 1979	5K	9.4	65
108	5	The Horns of Nimon	"Part One"	Kenny McBain	Anthony Read	22 December 1979	5L	6.0	—
108	5	The Horns of Nimon	"Part Two"	Kenny McBain	Anthony Read	29 December 1979	5L	8.8	—
108	5	The Horns of Nimon	"Part Three"	Kenny McBain	Anthony Read	5 January 1980	5L	9.8	—
108	5	The Horns of Nimon	"Part Four"	Kenny McBain	Anthony Read	12 January 1980	5L	10.4	67
108.5	—	Shada	N/A	Pennant Roberts	Douglas Adams	19 July 2018 (Note: Shada was initially left unfinished due to a strike. The serial was eventually completed using animation, released digitally in November 2017, and later broadcast by BBC America on 19 July 2018 in a feature-length edit.)	5M	—	—

==== Season 18 (1980–1981) ====
In a return to the format of early seasons, virtually all serials from Seasons 18 through 20 are linked together, often running directly into each other. Season 18 forms a loose story arc dealing with the theme of entropy. Full Circle, State of Decay, and Warriors' Gate trace the Doctor's adventures in E-Space; they were released in both VHS and DVD boxsets with the umbrella title The E-Space Trilogy. This season saw the departure of Romana and the introduction of companions Adric and Nyssa, and soon-to-be companion, Tegan Jovanka.

No. story	No. in season	Serial title	Episode titles	Directed by	Written by	Original release date	Prod. code	UK viewers (millions)	AI
109	1	The Leisure Hive	"Part One"	Lovett Bickford	David Fisher	30 August 1980	5N	5.9	—
109	1	The Leisure Hive	"Part Two"	Lovett Bickford	David Fisher	6 September 1980	5N	5.0	—
109	1	The Leisure Hive	"Part Three"	Lovett Bickford	David Fisher	13 September 1980	5N	5.0	—
109	1	The Leisure Hive	"Part Four"	Lovett Bickford	David Fisher	20 September 1980	5N	4.5	65
110	2	Meglos	"Part One"	Terence Dudley	John Flanagan & Andrew McCulloch	27 September 1980	5Q	5.0	61
110	2	Meglos	"Part Two"	Terence Dudley	John Flanagan & Andrew McCulloch	4 October 1980	5Q	4.2	64
110	2	Meglos	"Part Three"	Terence Dudley	John Flanagan & Andrew McCulloch	11 October 1980	5Q	4.7	—
110	2	Meglos	"Part Four"	Terence Dudley	John Flanagan & Andrew McCulloch	18 October 1980	5Q	4.7	63
111	3	Full Circle	"Part One"	Peter Grimwade	Andrew Smith	25 October 1980	5R	5.9	—
111	3	Full Circle	"Part Two"	Peter Grimwade	Andrew Smith	1 November 1980	5R	3.7	—
111	3	Full Circle	"Part Three"	Peter Grimwade	Andrew Smith	8 November 1980	5R	5.9	—
111	3	Full Circle	"Part Four"	Peter Grimwade	Andrew Smith	15 November 1980	5R	5.4	65
112	4	State of Decay	"Part One"	Peter Moffatt	Terrance Dicks	22 November 1980	5P	5.8	—
112	4	State of Decay	"Part Two"	Peter Moffatt	Terrance Dicks	29 November 1980	5P	5.3	—
112	4	State of Decay	"Part Three"	Peter Moffatt	Terrance Dicks	6 December 1980	5P	4.4	—
112	4	State of Decay	"Part Four"	Peter Moffatt	Terrance Dicks	13 December 1980	5P	5.4	69
113	5	Warriors' Gate	"Part One"	Paul Joyce & Graeme Harper (uncredited)	Stephen Gallagher	3 January 1981	5S	7.1	59
113	5	Warriors' Gate	"Part Two"	Paul Joyce & Graeme Harper (uncredited)	Stephen Gallagher	10 January 1981	5S	6.7	—
113	5	Warriors' Gate	"Part Three"	Paul Joyce & Graeme Harper (uncredited)	Stephen Gallagher	17 January 1981	5S	8.3	—
113	5	Warriors' Gate	"Part Four"	Paul Joyce & Graeme Harper (uncredited)	Stephen Gallagher	24 January 1981	5S	7.8	59
114	6	The Keeper of Traken	"Part One"	John Black	Johnny Byrne	31 January 1981	5T	7.6	—
114	6	The Keeper of Traken	"Part Two"	John Black	Johnny Byrne	7 February 1981	5T	6.1	—
114	6	The Keeper of Traken	"Part Three"	John Black	Johnny Byrne	14 February 1981	5T	5.2	—
114	6	The Keeper of Traken	"Part Four"	John Black	Johnny Byrne	21 February 1981	5T	6.1	63
115	7	Logopolis	"Part One"	Peter Grimwade	Christopher H. Bidmead	28 February 1981	5V	7.7	—
115	7	Logopolis	"Part Two"	Peter Grimwade	Christopher H. Bidmead	7 March 1981	5V	7.7	61
115	7	Logopolis	"Part Three"	Peter Grimwade	Christopher H. Bidmead	14 March 1981	5V	5.8	—
115	7	Logopolis	"Part Four"	Peter Grimwade	Christopher H. Bidmead	21 March 1981	5V	6.1	65

=== Fifth Doctor ===
The Fifth Doctor was portrayed by Peter Davison.

==== Season 19 (1982) ====
The show moved from its traditional once-weekly Saturday broadcast to being broadcast twice-weekly primarily on Monday and Tuesday, although there were regional variations to the schedule. Castrovalva, together with the previous two serials, The Keeper of Traken and Logopolis, form a trilogy involving the return of the Master. They were released on DVD under the banner title New Beginnings. The season marked the final appearance of Adric.

No. story	No. in season	Serial title	Episode titles	Directed by	Written by	Original release date	Prod. code	UK viewers (millions)	AI
116	1	Castrovalva	"Part One"	Fiona Cumming	Christopher H. Bidmead	4 January 1982	5Z	9.1	–
116	1	Castrovalva	"Part Two"	Fiona Cumming	Christopher H. Bidmead	5 January 1982	5Z	8.6	–
116	1	Castrovalva	"Part Three"	Fiona Cumming	Christopher H. Bidmead	11 January 1982	5Z	10.2	–
116	1	Castrovalva	"Part Four"	Fiona Cumming	Christopher H. Bidmead	12 January 1982	5Z	10.4	–
117	2	Four to Doomsday	"Part One"	John Black	Terence Dudley	18 January 1982	5W	8.4	–
117	2	Four to Doomsday	"Part Two"	John Black	Terence Dudley	19 January 1982	5W	8.8	–
117	2	Four to Doomsday	"Part Three"	John Black	Terence Dudley	25 January 1982	5W	8.9	–
117	2	Four to Doomsday	"Part Four"	John Black	Terence Dudley	26 January 1982	5W	9.4	–
118	3	Kinda	"Part One"	Peter Grimwade	Christopher Bailey	1 February 1982	5Y	8.4	–
118	3	Kinda	"Part Two"	Peter Grimwade	Christopher Bailey	2 February 1982	5Y	9.4	–
118	3	Kinda	"Part Three"	Peter Grimwade	Christopher Bailey	8 February 1982	5Y	8.5	–
118	3	Kinda	"Part Four"	Peter Grimwade	Christopher Bailey	9 February 1982	5Y	8.9	–
119	4	The Visitation	"Part One"	Peter Moffatt	Eric Saward	15 February 1982	5X	9.1	–
119	4	The Visitation	"Part Two"	Peter Moffatt	Eric Saward	16 February 1982	5X	9.3	–
119	4	The Visitation	"Part Three"	Peter Moffatt	Eric Saward	22 February 1982	5X	9.9	–
119	4	The Visitation	"Part Four"	Peter Moffatt	Eric Saward	23 February 1982	5X	10.1	–
120	5	Black Orchid	"Part One"	Ron Jones	Terence Dudley	1 March 1982	6A	9.9	–
120	5	Black Orchid	"Part Two"	Ron Jones	Terence Dudley	2 March 1982	6A	10.1	–
121	6	Earthshock	"Part One"	Peter Grimwade	Eric Saward	8 March 1982	6B	9.1	–
121	6	Earthshock	"Part Two"	Peter Grimwade	Eric Saward	9 March 1982	6B	8.8	–
121	6	Earthshock	"Part Three"	Peter Grimwade	Eric Saward	15 March 1982	6B	9.8	–
121	6	Earthshock	"Part Four"	Peter Grimwade	Eric Saward	16 March 1982	6B	9.6	–
122	7	Time-Flight	"Part One"	Ron Jones	Peter Grimwade	22 March 1982	6C	10.0	–
122	7	Time-Flight	"Part Two"	Ron Jones	Peter Grimwade	23 March 1982	6C	8.5	–
122	7	Time-Flight	"Part Three"	Ron Jones	Peter Grimwade	29 March 1982	6C	8.9	–
122	7	Time-Flight	"Part Four"	Ron Jones	Peter Grimwade	30 March 1982	6C	8.1	–

==== Season 20 (1983) ====
To commemorate the twentieth season, the stories in this season involve the return of previous villains: Omega, the Mara, the Black Guardian and the Master. Mawdryn Undead, Terminus and Enlightenment involve the Black Guardian's plot to force the Doctor's new companion Vislor Turlough to kill the Doctor; they were released individually on VHS and as a set on DVD as parts of The Black Guardian Trilogy. This season was broadcast twice weekly on Tuesday and Wednesday evenings on BBC1. This was the last season to feature Nyssa as a companion.

No. story	No. in season	Serial title	Episode titles	Directed by	Written by	Original release date	Prod. code	UK viewers (millions)	AI
123	1	Arc of Infinity	"Part One"	Ron Jones	Johnny Byrne	3 January 1983	6E	7.2	69
123	1	Arc of Infinity	"Part Two"	Ron Jones	Johnny Byrne	5 January 1983	6E	7.3	70
123	1	Arc of Infinity	"Part Three"	Ron Jones	Johnny Byrne	11 January 1983	6E	6.9	67
123	1	Arc of Infinity	"Part Four"	Ron Jones	Johnny Byrne	12 January 1983	6E	7.2	66
124	2	Snakedance	"Part One"	Fiona Cumming	Christopher Bailey	18 January 1983	6D	6.7	65
124	2	Snakedance	"Part Two"	Fiona Cumming	Christopher Bailey	19 January 1983	6D	7.7	66
124	2	Snakedance	"Part Three"	Fiona Cumming	Christopher Bailey	25 January 1983	6D	6.6	67
124	2	Snakedance	"Part Four"	Fiona Cumming	Christopher Bailey	26 January 1983	6D	7.4	67
125	3	Mawdryn Undead	"Part One"	Peter Moffatt	Peter Grimwade	1 February 1983	6F	6.5	67
125	3	Mawdryn Undead	"Part Two"	Peter Moffatt	Peter Grimwade	2 February 1983	6F	7.5	70
125	3	Mawdryn Undead	"Part Three"	Peter Moffatt	Peter Grimwade	8 February 1983	6F	7.4	67
125	3	Mawdryn Undead	"Part Four"	Peter Moffatt	Peter Grimwade	9 February 1983	6F	7.7	68
126	4	Terminus	"Part One"	Mary Ridge	Stephen Gallagher	15 February 1983 (Note: Terminus, "Part One" was first broadcast 14 February 1983 in Wales)	6G	6.8	65
126	4	Terminus	"Part Two"	Mary Ridge	Stephen Gallagher	16 February 1983	6G	7.5	67
126	4	Terminus	"Part Three"	Mary Ridge	Stephen Gallagher	22 February 1983	6G	6.5	64
126	4	Terminus	"Part Four"	Mary Ridge	Stephen Gallagher	23 February 1983	6G	7.4	67
127	5	Enlightenment	"Part One"	Fiona Cumming	Barbara Clegg	1 March 1983	6H	6.6	67
127	5	Enlightenment	"Part Two"	Fiona Cumming	Barbara Clegg	2 March 1983	6H	7.2	65
127	5	Enlightenment	"Part Three"	Fiona Cumming	Barbara Clegg	8 March 1983	6H	6.2	68
127	5	Enlightenment	"Part Four"	Fiona Cumming	Barbara Clegg	9 March 1983	6H	7.3	70
128	6	The King's Demons	"Part One"	Tony Virgo	Terence Dudley	15 March 1983	6J	5.8	65
128	6	The King's Demons	"Part Two"	Tony Virgo	Terence Dudley	16 March 1983	6J	7.2	63
Special
129	–	"The Five Doctors"	N/A	Peter Moffatt	Terrance Dicks	25 November 1983 (Note: The Five Doctors was first broadcast in the United States on 23 November 1983, the actual date of the programme's 20th anniversary.)	6K	7.7	75

==== Season 21 (1984) ====
Episodes were broadcast twice weekly on Thursday and Friday evenings, with Resurrection of the Daleks broadcast on two consecutive Wednesday nights in 45-minute, rather than 25-minute, parts. The Caves of Androzani saw the regeneration of the Fifth Doctor, and the season finale The Twin Dilemma was the first story of the Sixth Doctor. The season marked the departure of Tegan Jovanka and Vislor Turlough, as well as the introduction of Nicola Bryant as Peri Brown.

No. story	No. in season	Serial title	Episode titles	Directed by	Written by	Original release date	Prod. code	UK viewers (millions)	AI
130	1	Warriors of the Deep	"Part One"	Pennant Roberts	Johnny Byrne	5 January 1984	6L	7.6	65
130	1	Warriors of the Deep	"Part Two"	Pennant Roberts	Johnny Byrne	6 January 1984	6L	7.5	64
130	1	Warriors of the Deep	"Part Three"	Pennant Roberts	Johnny Byrne	12 January 1984	6L	7.3	62
130	1	Warriors of the Deep	"Part Four"	Pennant Roberts	Johnny Byrne	13 January 1984	6L	6.6	65
131	2	The Awakening	"Part One"	Michael Owen Morris	Eric Pringle	19 January 1984	6M	7.9	65
131	2	The Awakening	"Part Two"	Michael Owen Morris	Eric Pringle	20 January 1984	6M	6.6	63
132	3	Frontios	"Part One"	Ron Jones	Christopher H. Bidmead	26 January 1984	6N	8.0	66
132	3	Frontios	"Part Two"	Ron Jones	Christopher H. Bidmead	27 January 1984	6N	5.8	69
132	3	Frontios	"Part Three"	Ron Jones	Christopher H. Bidmead	2 February 1984	6N	7.8	65
132	3	Frontios	"Part Four"	Ron Jones	Christopher H. Bidmead	3 February 1984	6N	5.6	65
133	4	Resurrection of the Daleks	"Part One"	Matthew Robinson	Eric Saward	8 February 1984	6P	7.3	69
133	4	Resurrection of the Daleks	"Part Two"	Matthew Robinson	Eric Saward	15 February 1984	6P	8.0	65
134	5	Planet of Fire	"Part One"	Fiona Cumming	Peter Grimwade	23 February 1984	6Q	7.4	—
134	5	Planet of Fire	"Part Two"	Fiona Cumming	Peter Grimwade	24 February 1984	6Q	6.1	—
134	5	Planet of Fire	"Part Three"	Fiona Cumming	Peter Grimwade	1 March 1984	6Q	7.4	—
134	5	Planet of Fire	"Part Four"	Fiona Cumming	Peter Grimwade	2 March 1984	6Q	7.0	—
135	6	The Caves of Androzani	"Part One"	Graeme Harper	Robert Holmes	8 March 1984	6R	6.9	65
135	6	The Caves of Androzani	"Part Two"	Graeme Harper	Robert Holmes	9 March 1984	6R	6.6	—
135	6	The Caves of Androzani	"Part Three"	Graeme Harper	Robert Holmes	15 March 1984	6R	7.8	65
135	6	The Caves of Androzani	"Part Four"	Graeme Harper	Robert Holmes	16 March 1984	6R	7.8	68

=== Sixth Doctor ===
The Sixth Doctor was portrayed by Colin Baker.

==== Season 21 (1984) continued ====
No. story	No. in season	Serial title	Episode titles	Directed by	Written by	Original release date	Prod. code	UK viewers (millions)	AI
136	7	The Twin Dilemma	"Part One"	Peter Moffatt	Anthony Steven	22 March 1984	6S	7.6	61
136	7	The Twin Dilemma	"Part Two"	Peter Moffatt	Anthony Steven	23 March 1984	6S	7.4	66
136	7	The Twin Dilemma	"Part Three"	Peter Moffatt	Anthony Steven	29 March 1984	6S	7.0	59
136	7	The Twin Dilemma	"Part Four"	Peter Moffatt	Anthony Steven	30 March 1984	6S	6.3	67

==== Season 22 (1985) ====
The series moved back to once-weekly Saturday broadcasts. All episodes were 45 minutes long, though 25-minute edits were produced for foreign markets. Although there were now only 13 episodes in the season, the total running time remained approximately the same as in previous seasons since the episodes were almost twice as long.

No. story	No. in season	Serial title	Episode titles	Directed by	Written by	Original release date	Prod. code	UK viewers (millions)	AI
137	1	Attack of the Cybermen	"Part One"	Matthew Robinson	Paula Moore	5 January 1985	6T	8.9	61
137	1	Attack of the Cybermen	"Part Two"	Matthew Robinson	Paula Moore	12 January 1985	6T	7.2	65
138	2	Vengeance on Varos	"Part One"	Ron Jones	Philip Martin	19 January 1985	6V	7.2	63
138	2	Vengeance on Varos	"Part Two"	Ron Jones	Philip Martin	26 January 1985	6V	7.0	65
139	3	The Mark of the Rani	"Part One"	Sarah Hellings	Pip and Jane Baker	2 February 1985	6X	6.3	64
139	3	The Mark of the Rani	"Part Two"	Sarah Hellings	Pip and Jane Baker	9 February 1985	6X	7.3	64
140	4	The Two Doctors	"Part One"	Peter Moffatt	Robert Holmes	16 February 1985	6W	6.6	65
140	4	The Two Doctors	"Part Two"	Peter Moffatt	Robert Holmes	23 February 1985	6W	6.0	62
140	4	The Two Doctors	"Part Three"	Peter Moffatt	Robert Holmes	2 March 1985	6W	6.9	65
141	5	Timelash	"Part One"	Pennant Roberts	Glen McCoy	9 March 1985	6Y	6.7	66
141	5	Timelash	"Part Two"	Pennant Roberts	Glen McCoy	16 March 1985	6Y	7.4	64
142	6	Revelation of the Daleks	"Part One"	Graeme Harper	Eric Saward	23 March 1985	6Z	7.4	67
142	6	Revelation of the Daleks	"Part Two"	Graeme Harper	Eric Saward	30 March 1985	6Z	7.7	65

==== Season 23 (1986) ====
The whole season is titled as The Trial of a Time Lord, and is split into four segments. The segments are commonly referred to by their respective novelisations' titles (listed below) but the season was broadcast as one fourteen-part story and these titles did not appear on screen. Episode length returned to 25 minutes, but with only fourteen episodes in the season, making the total running time of this season (and subsequent seasons) just over half of the previous seasons, going back to season 7. The season saw the departure of Peri and the introduction of Bonnie Langford as companion Mel Bush.

No. story	No. in season	Serial title	Episode titles	Directed by	Written by	Original release date	Prod. code	UK viewers (millions)	AI
143a	1	The Mysterious Planet	"Part One"	Nicholas Mallett	Robert Holmes	6 September 1986	7A	4.9	72
143a	1	The Mysterious Planet	"Part Two"	Nicholas Mallett	Robert Holmes	13 September 1986	7A	4.9	69
143a	1	The Mysterious Planet	"Part Three"	Nicholas Mallett	Robert Holmes	20 September 1986	7A	3.9	70
143a	1	The Mysterious Planet	"Part Four"	Nicholas Mallett	Robert Holmes	27 September 1986	7A	3.7	72
143b	2	Mindwarp	"Part Five"	Ron Jones	Philip Martin	4 October 1986	7B	4.8	71
143b	2	Mindwarp	"Part Six"	Ron Jones	Philip Martin	11 October 1986	7B	4.6	69
143b	2	Mindwarp	"Part Seven"	Ron Jones	Philip Martin	18 October 1986	7B	5.1	66
143b	2	Mindwarp	"Part Eight"	Ron Jones	Philip Martin	25 October 1986	7B	5.0	72
143c	3	Terror of the Vervoids	"Part Nine"	Chris Clough	Pip and Jane Baker	1 November 1986	7C	5.2	66
143c	3	Terror of the Vervoids	"Part Ten"	Chris Clough	Pip and Jane Baker	8 November 1986	7C	4.6	69
143c	3	Terror of the Vervoids	"Part Eleven"	Chris Clough	Pip and Jane Baker	15 November 1986	7C	5.3	69
143c	3	Terror of the Vervoids	"Part Twelve"	Chris Clough	Pip and Jane Baker	22 November 1986	7C	5.2	69
143d	4	The Ultimate Foe	"Part Thirteen"	Chris Clough	Robert Holmes	29 November 1986	7C	4.4	69
143d	4	The Ultimate Foe	"Part Fourteen"	Chris Clough	Pip and Jane Baker	6 December 1986	7C	5.6	69

=== Seventh Doctor ===
The Seventh Doctor was portrayed by Sylvester McCoy.

==== Season 24 (1987) ====
This season was moved to a Monday schedule. Mel Bush left in Dragonfire with recurring character Sabalom Glitz (Tony Selby), and the companion role was taken over by Sophie Aldred as Ace.

No. story	No. in season	Serial title	Episode titles	Directed by	Written by	Original release date	Prod. code	UK viewers (millions)	AI
144	1	Time and the Rani	"Part One"	Andrew Morgan	Pip and Jane Baker	7 September 1987	7D	5.1	58
144	1	Time and the Rani	"Part Two"	Andrew Morgan	Pip and Jane Baker	14 September 1987	7D	4.2	63
144	1	Time and the Rani	"Part Three"	Andrew Morgan	Pip and Jane Baker	21 September 1987	7D	4.3	57
144	1	Time and the Rani	"Part Four"	Andrew Morgan	Pip and Jane Baker	28 September 1987	7D	4.9	59
145	2	Paradise Towers	"Part One"	Nicholas Mallett	Stephen Wyatt	5 October 1987	7E	4.5	61
145	2	Paradise Towers	"Part Two"	Nicholas Mallett	Stephen Wyatt	12 October 1987	7E	5.2	58
145	2	Paradise Towers	"Part Three"	Nicholas Mallett	Stephen Wyatt	19 October 1987	7E	5.0	58
145	2	Paradise Towers	"Part Four"	Nicholas Mallett	Stephen Wyatt	26 October 1987	7E	5.0	57
146	3	Delta and the Bannermen	"Part One"	Chris Clough	Malcolm Kohll	2 November 1987	7F	5.3	63
146	3	Delta and the Bannermen	"Part Two"	Chris Clough	Malcolm Kohll	9 November 1987	7F	5.1	60
146	3	Delta and the Bannermen	"Part Three"	Chris Clough	Malcolm Kohll	16 November 1987	7F	5.4	60
147	4	Dragonfire	"Part One"	Chris Clough	Ian Briggs	23 November 1987	7G	5.5	61
147	4	Dragonfire	"Part Two"	Chris Clough	Ian Briggs	30 November 1987	7G	5.0	61
147	4	Dragonfire	"Part Three"	Chris Clough	Ian Briggs	7 December 1987	7G	4.7	64

==== Season 25 (1988–1989) ====
The series was moved to Wednesdays. The programme celebrated its 25th anniversary with the serial story Silver Nemesis.

No. story	No. in season	Serial title	Episode titles	Directed by	Written by	Original release date	Prod. code	UK viewers (millions)	AI
148	1	Remembrance of the Daleks	"Part One"	Andrew Morgan	Ben Aaronovitch	5 October 1988	7H	5.5	68
148	1	Remembrance of the Daleks	"Part Two"	Andrew Morgan	Ben Aaronovitch	12 October 1988	7H	5.8	69
148	1	Remembrance of the Daleks	"Part Three"	Andrew Morgan	Ben Aaronovitch	19 October 1988	7H	5.1	70
148	1	Remembrance of the Daleks	"Part Four"	Andrew Morgan	Ben Aaronovitch	26 October 1988	7H	5.0	72
149	2	The Happiness Patrol	"Part One"	Chris Clough	Graeme Curry	2 November 1988	7L	5.3	67
149	2	The Happiness Patrol	"Part Two"	Chris Clough	Graeme Curry	9 November 1988	7L	4.6	65
149	2	The Happiness Patrol	"Part Three"	Chris Clough	Graeme Curry	16 November 1988	7L	5.3	65
150	3	Silver Nemesis	"Part One"	Chris Clough	Kevin Clarke	23 November 1988	7K	6.1	71
150	3	Silver Nemesis	"Part Two"	Chris Clough	Kevin Clarke	30 November 1988 (Note: Parts Two and Three of Silver Nemesis were first broadcast in New Zealand on 25 November 1988 as part of a compilation broadcast before their UK transmission.)	7K	5.2	70
150	3	Silver Nemesis	"Part Three"	Chris Clough	Kevin Clarke	7 December 1988	7K	5.2	70
151	4	The Greatest Show in the Galaxy	"Part One"	Alan Wareing	Stephen Wyatt	14 December 1988	7J	5.0	68
151	4	The Greatest Show in the Galaxy	"Part Two"	Alan Wareing	Stephen Wyatt	21 December 1988	7J	5.3	66
151	4	The Greatest Show in the Galaxy	"Part Three"	Alan Wareing	Stephen Wyatt	28 December 1988	7J	4.8	69
151	4	The Greatest Show in the Galaxy	"Part Four"	Alan Wareing	Stephen Wyatt	4 January 1989	7J	6.6	64

==== Season 26 (1989) ====
The final season continued to push the series towards a darker approach, focusing this time more on Ace's personal life as well as The Doctor's past and manipulations. This season set the tone for the Virgin New Adventures novels that followed.

No. story	No. in season	Serial title	Episode titles	Directed by	Written by	Original release date	Prod. code	UK viewers (millions)	AI
152	1	Battlefield	"Part One"	Michael Kerrigan	Ben Aaronovitch	6 September 1989	7N	3.1	69
152	1	Battlefield	"Part Two"	Michael Kerrigan	Ben Aaronovitch	13 September 1989	7N	3.9	68
152	1	Battlefield	"Part Three"	Michael Kerrigan	Ben Aaronovitch	20 September 1989	7N	3.6	67
152	1	Battlefield	"Part Four"	Michael Kerrigan	Ben Aaronovitch	27 September 1989	7N	4.0	65
153	2	Ghost Light	"Part One"	Alan Wareing	Marc Platt	4 October 1989	7Q	4.2	68
153	2	Ghost Light	"Part Two"	Alan Wareing	Marc Platt	11 October 1989	7Q	4.0	68
153	2	Ghost Light	"Part Three"	Alan Wareing	Marc Platt	18 October 1989	7Q	4.0	64
154	3	The Curse of Fenric	"Part One"	Nicholas Mallett	Ian Briggs	25 October 1989	7M	4.3	67
154	3	The Curse of Fenric	"Part Two"	Nicholas Mallett	Ian Briggs	1 November 1989	7M	4.0	68
154	3	The Curse of Fenric	"Part Three"	Nicholas Mallett	Ian Briggs	8 November 1989	7M	4.0	68
154	3	The Curse of Fenric	"Part Four"	Nicholas Mallett	Ian Briggs	15 November 1989	7M	4.2	68
155	4	Survival	"Part One"	Alan Wareing	Rona Munro	22 November 1989	7P	5.0	69
155	4	Survival	"Part Two"	Alan Wareing	Rona Munro	29 November 1989	7P	4.8	69
155	4	Survival	"Part Three"	Alan Wareing	Rona Munro	6 December 1989	7P	5.0	71

=== Eighth Doctor ===
The Eighth Doctor was portrayed by Paul McGann. The television movie is the only televised appearance of the character during his tenure. The DVD release is titled Doctor Who: The Movie. In 2013, Paul McGann returned for the second television appearance of the Eighth Doctor in minisode titled "The Night of the Doctor". The production code is 50/LDX071Y/01X, though Doctor Who Magazine's "Complete Eighth Doctor Special" gives the code as #83705 and the BBC's online episode guide as "TVM".

==== Television film (1996) ====
No. story	Title	Directed by	Written by	Original release date	Prod. code	UK viewers (millions)	AI
156	Doctor Who	Geoffrey Sax	Matthew Jacobs	12 May 1996 (Canada); 14 May 1996 (USA); 27 May 1996 (UK)	50/LDX071Y/01X	9.08	75

== See also ==
- List of Doctor Who Christmas and New Year's specials
- List of unmade Doctor Who serials and films
- List of supplementary Doctor Who episodes
