= Thane Bettany =

British actor and ballet dancer (1929–2015)

- Born: Thane William Howard Hardcastle Christopher Bettany; 28 May 1929; Kingdom of Sarawak
- Died: 7 November 2015 (aged 86); Cupar, Fife, Scotland
- Occupations: Actor; dancer; drama teacher
- Years active: 1953–1985
- Spouse: Anne Kettle (m. 1968; div. 1993)
- Partner(s): Andy Clark (1994–2015, his death)
- Children: 3, including Paul Bettany
- Relatives: Jennifer Connelly (daughter-in-law)

Thane William Howard Hardcastle Christopher Bettany (28 May 1929 – 7 November 2015) was an English actor and dancer. He is the father of film and theatre actor Paul Bettany.

== Early years ==
Thane Bettany was born in Sarawak, an independent state on the island of Borneo, which was then a British protectorate governed by the White Rajahs. Thane grew up with an elder brother, named Peter Bettany. His godmother was the American memoirist Agnes Newton Keith, author of Three Came Home.

During World War 2 he was a border at Lucton school, near Leominster inEngland.

The Bettanys knew the Rhys-Jones family, also British expats in Sarawak. In 1965, when both had been widowed, Howard John Bettany, Thane's father, married Margaret Rhys-Jones (née Molesworth; a descendant of Robert Molesworth, 1st Viscount Molesworth). The same year, further intermingling the families, Thane Bettany stood godfather to his new stepbrother's daughter, Sophie. In 1999 he was summoned by royal command to attend her wedding to Prince Edward, when she became Countess of Wessex (later Duchess of Edinburgh).

== Dancing career ==
Bettany had become enamoured with ballet after seeing a performance as a child. Once he left school he took the money given to him by his father to go to school to study ballet. After National Service, when he served in the Royal Navy's Fleet Air Arm as a mechanic, he entered Sadler's Wells Ballet School (which later became the Royal Ballet School). He began dancing in musical theatre, but after an accident on stage when he broke his back he had to give up professional dance. Acting was an obvious career move, but he had a stammer. He went to study mime in Paris with Charles Antonetti, who helped him manage his stammer. Bettany returned to England and joined the Shakespeare Memorial Theatre Company, which would later become the Royal Shakespeare Company. He played Osric to Sir Michael Redgrave's Hamlet. In The Tempest, he was the understudy for the role of Ferdinand; he then took over the part when the play transferred to Drury Lane with Sir John Gielgud.

== Personal life ==
After a few years with the New Zealand Players, he returned home and taught at Corona Stage School, where he met Anne Kettle, whom he would later marry. He moved on to Norway as the artistic director of the English Theatre Company there, inviting Kettle over as his stage manager. Back in England they renewed their friendship at the Lincoln Theatre Royale. They married and settled in North London, "a rough estate in Harlesden" according to their son, and although stage work continued to be his focus, when his children were born he looked for other work to be closer to home. He continued to act, mainly in television; during this period he was cast in one of his most famous roles, as Tarak on Doctor Who.

The couple had three children: daughter Sarah, elder son Paul and younger son Matthew. Sarah and Paul initially attended school in North London. When Sarah, Paul and Matthew were 11, 9 and 2 years old, respectively, their father obtained employment as a drama teacher at the Hertfordshire all-girls boarding school, Queenswood School; the family lived on campus.

His son, Matthew, died after a fall at Queenswood when he was 8. Soon after, Paul left home to live on his own in London. Thane and Anne divorced in 1993 after 25 years of marriage. Bettany considered paying privately for sex-reassignment surgery, as he was too old for NHS protocols; in the end he judged it too expensive, and likely to hinder his remaining acting career. He lived in Fife, Scotland with his partner, Andy Little, continuing to work regularly as an actor, including performing with Dundee Rep until his death in November 2015. According to his son Paul, following the death of Andy after a 20-year relationship, Thane "went back into the closet" out of difficulties with grief and with reconciling his sexuality and Catholicism, fearing "not being able to get into Heaven".

Bettany became the father-in-law of actress Jennifer Connelly, when she married his son Paul in 2003.

== Filmography ==
Year	Title	Role	Notes
1957	Fire Down Below		
1980	North Sea Hijack	Heyerdahl	
1980	Doctor Who	Tarak	Episode: "State of Decay"
1980–1981	The Talisman	Theodoric	4 episodes
1985	Maelstrom	Mr. Tovan	Episode: "In Possession", (final appearance)
