= Van Steenis =

Van Steenis is a Dutch surname. People with the surname include:

- Cornelis Gijsbert Gerrit Jan van Steenis (1901–1986), Dutch botanist
- Costello van Steenis (born 1992), Dutch mixed martial artist
- Huw van Steenis (born 1969), British financier
- Niels van Steenis (born 1969), Dutch rower
