= Wedding dress of Sophie Rhys-Jones =

Dress worn by Sophie Rhys-Jones at her wedding to Prince Edward in 1999

The wedding dress of Sophie Rhys-Jones is the bridal gown worn by her at her wedding to Prince Edward, Earl of Wessex (youngest son of Queen Elizabeth II and Prince Philip, Duke of Edinburgh) on 19 June 1999 at St George's Chapel, Windsor Castle. The dress was designed by Samantha Shaw.

== Overview ==
The dress is made of hand-dyed silk organza and hand-dyed silk crepe. It is full-length, with long sleeves and the detail consists of rows of pearls and crystal beading around the neck, sleeves and train, with further beading down the back and front of the dress-coat. 325,000 cut-glass and pearl beads are sewn on the dress, which is corseted, with a v-neck. The full-length veil is one inch longer than the train. It is made of hand-dyed silk tulle, and hand-finished with spotted crystal detail. The train is long, and the bride carried a bouquet of ivory roses.

To accompany the dress, the bride also wore a black-and-white pearl necklace, interspersed with white gold rondels, and a matching pair of black-and-white pearl drop earrings, designed by Prince Edward and made by Asprey and Garrard & Co as a wedding gift from Edward. Sophie wore a diamond tiara, from the Queen's private collection, consisting of three open-work scroll motifs, designed and re-modelled by the Crown Jeweller, David Thomas, at Asprey and Garrard. Her shoes were three-inch heel court shoes made of silk crepe by Gina.

== See also ==
- Wedding of Prince Edward and Sophie Rhys-Jones
- Wedding dress of Princess Beatrice of York
- List of individual dresses
