= Amanda Pullinger =

Non profit chief executive

- Born: 1966 (age 59–60); Birmingham, UK
- Education: Brasenose College, Oxford

Amanda Pullinger is Chief Executive Officer of Debbie's Dream Foundation: Curing Stomach Cancer, as of December 2025.

She is also the Co-Founder and Principal of Global Female Investors Management LLC, a global firm focused on increasing the number of female investors across asset classes. The Global Female Investors Network (GFIN) serves female risk takers across asset classes, enabling global connectivity to peers, and access to career and business opportunities.

She is the Former Chief Executive Officer of 100 Women in Finance, previously 100 Women in Hedge Funds. Pullinger led the organization in its growth from a few hundred members in New York to over 30,000 registered members in 32 locations across five continents. 100 Women launched its new name and branding at the Closing Bell of the NYSE on 14 December 2016. In 2009, she succeeded in bringing in Britain’s Prince William as the Patron of 100 Women in Hedge Funds. Pullinger welcomed William and his wife Catherine (the then-Duke and Duchess of Cambridge) to the 100WHF's London Gala in 2011. In late 2012, it was announced that the Duke and Duchess of Cambridge and Prince Harry would all be Patrons of 100WHF's Philanthropic Initiatives beginning in January 2013. In October 2013, a day after the christening of Prince George, Pullinger welcomed the Duchess of Cambridge to 100WHF's London Gala for the benefit of Action on Addiction. She then welcomed the Duchess of Cambridge to 100WHF's 2015 Gala in London for the benefit of The Art Room.

In addition to 100 Women in Hedge Funds, Pullinger has worked with other organizations, such as the American Red Cross of Greater New York, to encourage volunteerism amongst female business leaders.

Pullinger grew up in the UK where she attended Malvern Hall School and Solihull Sixth Form College before reading Modern History at Brasenose College, Oxford. She attended Brasenose at the same time as David Cameron, Camilla Cavendish and Andrew Feldman. Pullinger started her career in the hedge fund industry in New York with Guy Spier as a partner at Aquamarine Capital. From 2000 - 2005 Pullinger served on the board of the Oxford Alumni Association of New York. In January, 2014, she joined the board of the HALO Trust, and was made chairman in May 2014. The HALO Trust is a UK charity that is the world's oldest and largest humanitarian landmine clearance organization. Prince Harry served as its 25th Anniversary Patron. She was elected as a Director to the Oxford University Alumni Board in September, 2016. She was previously on the board of directors of the Cancer Institute of the NYU Medical Center.

Pullinger received a Lifetime Achievement Award from Markets Media at their 2015 Women in Finance Awards held in NYC.

Pullinger has spoken approvingly of the work of HRH The Countess of Wessex, telling Town and Country, "She actually presents herself as an ordinary person and I think that is increasingly what the royal family needs to do."
