= Camilla Cavendish, Baroness Cavendish of Little Venice =

British journalist and politician (born 1968)

The Right Honourable The Baroness Cavendish of Little Venice
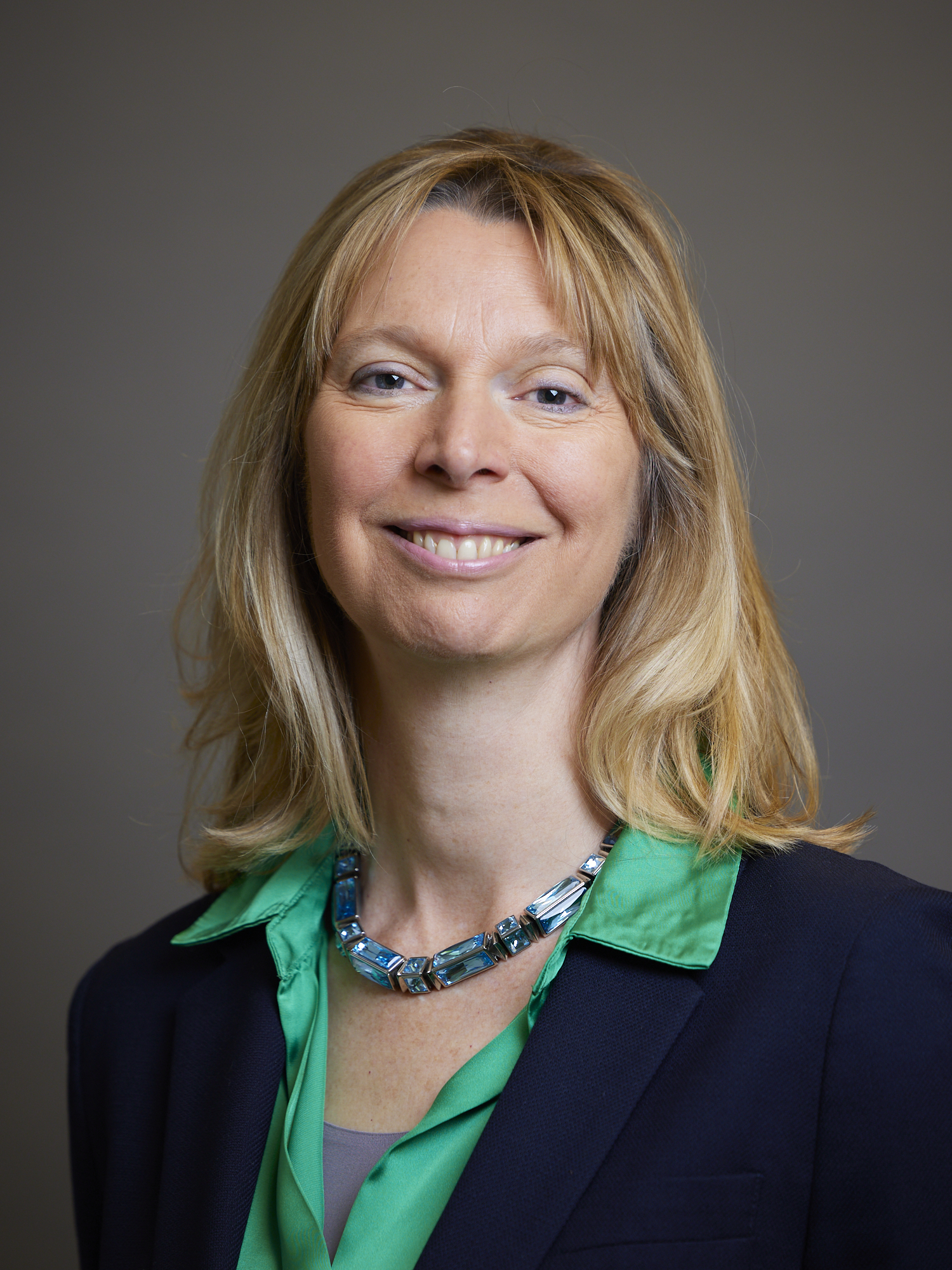
- Official portrait, 2024

Member of the House of Lords
- Lord Temporal
- Life peerage 6 September 2016

Director of the Number 10 Policy Unit
- In office 21 May 2015 – 13 July 2016
- Prime Minister: David Cameron
- Preceded by: Jo Johnson
- Succeeded by: John Godfrey

Personal details
- Born: Hilary Camilla Cavendish; 20 August 1968 (age 58)
- Party: Non-affiliated (since December 2016); Conservative (formerly)
- Spouse: Huw van Steenis
- Children: 3
- Parent(s): Richard Cavendish; J.M. Cavendish
- Education: Brasenose College, Oxford (PPE); Harvard University (MPA)

Hilary Camilla Cavendish, Baroness Cavendish of Little Venice (born 20 August 1968) is a British journalist, contributing editor and columnist at the Financial Times, senior fellow at Harvard University and former director of policy for Prime Minister David Cameron. Cavendish became a Conservative Member of the House of Lords in Cameron's resignation honours, but resigned the party whip in December 2016 to sit as a non-affiliated peer.

== Early life and education ==
Cavendish's father was historian Richard Cavendish. She was educated at Putney High School and graduated from Brasenose College, Oxford, in 1989 with a first-class degree in philosophy, politics and economics. At university, she was a contemporary of David Cameron, Andrew Feldman, Guy Spier and Amanda Pullinger and Bill O'Chee. She was a Kennedy Scholar for two years at the John F. Kennedy School of Government at Harvard University, gaining the degree of Master of Public Administration (MPA).

== Career ==
From 2002 until 2012, Cavendish worked at The Times, where she was associate editor, columnist and, in 2010, chief leader writer. She then worked at The Sunday Times from 2012 to May 2015. She is a contributing editor and columnist at the Financial Times.

She has worked as an aide to the CEO of Pearson plc.

She helped to found the lobby group, London First, and was the first CEO of the not-for-profit trust, South Bank Employers' Group, which masterminded the regeneration of the South Bank of the Thames in London in the late 1990s.

From May 2015 to July 2016, Cavendish was head of the prime minister's policy unit at No10 Downing Street, succeeding Jo Johnson. Amongst her initiatives, Cavendish is credited with persuading the prime Minister and chancellor of the benefits of a sugar tax: she said that the "link between sugary drinks and obesity are clear and stark". The Soft Drinks Industry Levy came into force in April 2018.

HarperCollins published Cavendish's book, Extra Time, in May 2019. The Bodley Head published Cavendish's book Generation Maybe in 2026.

== Recognition ==
Cavendish was awarded the 2008 Paul Foot Award for campaigning journalism and in 2009 the "Campaigning Journalist of the Year" at the British Press Awards. About her prize for Campaigning Journalist of the Year, the judges said: "A good newspaper campaign should be about an issue of serious injustice and strong public interest. A great one will be unexpected, one in which the outcome is not a done deal and which will in the end effect serious change. This campaign does that." Cavendish won the awards for her articles in The Times about the child protection injustices which she said resulted from the Children Act 1989 and the practices of family courts dealing with child protection issues. The campaign convinced the Secretary of State for Justice Jack Straw to introduce legislation which opened the family courts to the media in 2009.

Cavendish was Harold Wincott Senior Financial Journalist of the Year 2012.

She was assessed by the Health Service Journal to be the 85th-most influential person in the English NHS in 2015.

She was nominated for a life peerage as part of David Cameron's Resignation Honours and was created Baroness Cavendish of Little Venice, of Mells in the County of Somerset, on 6 September 2016. After gaining an unidentified post that required her to sever any party links, she resigned the Conservative whip in December 2016 to sit in the House of Lords as a non-affiliated peer.

Cavendish became a regular contributor to BBC Radio 4's Today programme in 2017. She was ranked the fifth-most influential woman in the UK in the BBC Radio 4 Woman’s Hour 2015 Power List.

== Appointments ==
=== Public sector ===
On 3 June 2013, she was appointed as a board member for the Care Quality Commission.

In 2013, Jeremy Hunt, Secretary of State for Health, asked Cavendish to lead "An Independent Review into Healthcare Assistants and Support Workers in the NHS and social care settings". The Cavendish Review was published in July 2013. Among the recommendations were “Common training standards across health and social care", and a new ‘Certificate of Fundamental Care’, written in language that is meaningful to patients and the public. For the first time, this would link healthcare assistant training to nurse training. In 2013, Cavendish also became a trustee of the Foundation Years Trust chaired by Frank Field MP.

In 2020, Cavendish was called back into government as an adviser to the Department of Health, and led an internal review of the future of social care and health reform.

=== Private sector ===
Cavendish became a trustee of the think-tank Policy Exchange in 2002 and was a trustee of the Thames Festival Trust between 2000 and 2007.

Cavendish was appointed chair of children's charity, Frontline, in 2017.

In 2018, she was appointed senior fellow at the Mossavar-Rahmani Center for Business and Government, Harvard Kennedy School.

== Personal life ==
Cavendish is married to the financier Huw van Steenis; they have three children.
