= Duchess of Edinburgh =

Royal title

- Arms of Sophie, Duchess of Edinburgh
- First holder: Princess Augusta of Saxe-Gotha-Altenburg
- Present holder: Sophie Rhys-Jones
- Status: Extant

Duchess of Edinburgh is the principal courtesy title held by the wife of the Duke of Edinburgh. There have been five Duchesses of Edinburgh since the title's creation. Following the accession of Charles III in 2022, the 3rd creation of the Dukedom of Edinburgh merged in the Crown. Following his parents’ wishes, on 10 March 2023, Charles III conferred the title Duke of Edinburgh on his youngest brother, Prince Edward, and his wife, Sophie, became the Duchess of Edinburgh.

== 1736 first creation ==
Princess Augusta of Saxe-Gotha was also Princess of Wales between 1736 and 1751, and Dowager Princess of Wales thereafter. Princess Augusta's eldest son succeeded as George III of the United Kingdom in 1760, as her husband, Frederick, Prince of Wales, had died nine years earlier.

== 1874 second creation ==
Grand Duchess Maria Alexandrovna of Russia was the fifth child and only surviving daughter of Tsar Alexander II of Russia and his first wife Tsarina Maria Alexandrovna. She was the younger sister of Tsar Alexander III of Russia and the paternal aunt of Russia's last Tsar, Nicholas II. In 1874, Maria Alexandrovna married Prince Alfred, Duke of Edinburgh, the second son of Queen Victoria and Prince Albert; she was the first and only Romanov to marry into the British royal family. In August 1893, Maria Alexandrovna became Duchess of Saxe-Coburg and Gotha when her husband inherited the duchy on the death of his childless uncle, Ernest II, Duke of Saxe-Coburg and Gotha. The new Duchess of Edinburgh was celebrated by rose grower Henry Bennett who named a bright crimson double hybrid tea rose he had bought from another grower (Schwartz) after her.

== 1947 third creation ==
Elizabeth II was Queen of the United Kingdom from her accession in 1952 to her death in 2022. Her husband Prince Philip of Greece and Denmark was created Duke of Edinburgh just before their wedding on 20 November 1947. From their marriage until her accession as Queen, Elizabeth was styled "Her Royal Highness The Princess Elizabeth, Duchess of Edinburgh."

Upon the death of Prince Philip on 9 April 2021, Prince Charles acceded to the dukedom. Thus, his wife, Camilla, became Duchess of Edinburgh. Upon the death of Elizabeth II, Charles became king, making Camilla queen consort and his titles merged in the Crown.

== 2023 fourth creation ==
It was announced in 1999, at the time of the wedding of Prince Edward, Earl of Wessex, that he would eventually follow his father as Duke of Edinburgh. Edward was granted the dukedom on his 59th birthday, 10 March 2023, by his brother King Charles III. Prince Edward's wife, Sophie, became Duchess of Edinburgh. This creation however is for life and non-hereditary, meaning that James, Earl of Wessex will not inherit the dukedom.

== Duchesses of Edinburgh ==
=== First holder ===
Subsidiary titles: Marchioness of the Isle of Ely, Countess of Eltham, Viscountess of Launceston, Baroness of Snaudon.

| Duchess | Portrait | Birth | Marriage(s) | Death |
|---|---|---|---|---|
| Princess Augusta of Saxe-Gotha-Altenburg; House of Saxe-Gotha-Altenburg (by birth); House of Hanover (by marriage) | Princess Augusta | 30 November 1719; Gotha, Duchy of Saxe-Gotha-Altenburg – daughter of Frederick II, Duke of Saxe-Gotha-Altenburg and Princess Magdalena Augusta of Anhalt-Zerbst | 8 May 1736; Frederick, Prince of Wales; 9 children | 8 February 1772 aged 52 |

=== Second holder ===
Subsidiary titles: Countess of Kent, Countess of Ulster.

| Duchess | Portrait | Birth | Marriage(s) | Death |
|---|---|---|---|---|
| Grand Duchess Maria Alexandrovna of Russia; House of Romanov (by birth); House of Saxe-Coburg and Gotha (by marriage) | Grand Duchess Maria Alexandrovna | 17 October 1853; Alexander Palace, St. Petersburg – daughter of Alexander II of Russia and Princess Marie of Hesse and by Rhine | 23 January 1874; Prince Alfred; 5 children | 24 October 1920 aged 67 |

=== Third and fourth holders ===
Subsidiary titles: Countess of Merioneth, Baroness Greenwich.

| Duchess | Portrait | Birth | Marriage(s) | Death | Arms |
|---|---|---|---|---|---|
| Princess Elizabeth; House of Windsor | Elizabeth II | 21 April 1926; Mayfair, London – daughter of George VI and Lady Elizabeth Bowes-Lyon | 20 November 1947; Philip Mountbatten; 4 children | 8 September 2022 aged 96 | |
| Camilla Shand; Shand family (by birth); House of Windsor (by marriage) | Camilla | 17 July 1947; King's College Hospital, London – daughter of Bruce Shand and the Hon. Rosalind Cubitt | 9 April 2005; Charles, Prince of Wales | – now 79 years, 112 days old | |

=== Fifth holder ===
Subsidiary titles: Countess of Wessex, Countess of Forfar, Viscountess Severn

| Duchess | Portrait | Birth | Marriage(s) | Death | Arms |
|---|---|---|---|---|---|
| Sophie Rhys-Jones; Rhys-Jones family (by birth); House of Windsor (by marriage) | Sophie | 20 January 1965; Radcliffe Infirmary, Oxford – daughter of Christopher Rhys-Jones and Mary O'Sullivan | 19 June 1999; Prince Edward; 2 children | – now 61 years, 290 days old | |
