= State of Decay (Doctor Who) =

112 – State of Decay
- Doctor Who serial
- Aukon, one of the vampiric Three Who Rule, stares down Adric in Part Two. Make-up designer Norma Hill used foundation and red highlights to create the look of the vampires.

Cast
- Doctor: Tom Baker – Fourth Doctor
- Companions: Lalla Ward – Romana; Matthew Waterhouse – Adric; John Leeson – Voice of K9
- Others: William Lindsay – Zargo; Rachel Davies – Camilla; Emrys James – Aukon; Clinton Greyn – Ivo; Rhoda Lewis – Marta; Dean Allen – Karl; Thane Bettany – Tarak; Iain Rattray – Habris; Arthur Hewlett – Kalmar; Stacy Davies – Veros; Stuart Fell – Roga; Stuart Blake – Zoldaz

Production
- Directed by: Peter Moffatt
- Written by: Terrance Dicks
- Script editor: Christopher H. Bidmead
- Produced by: John Nathan-Turner
- Executive producer: Barry Letts
- Music by: Paddy Kingsland
- Production code: 5P
- Series: Season 18
- Running time: 4 episodes, 25 minutes each
- First broadcast: 22 November 1980
- Last broadcast: 13 December 1980

Chronology
← Preceded by Full Circle	Followed by → Warriors' Gate

State of Decay is the fourth serial of the 18th season in the British science fiction television series Doctor Who. Written by longtime Doctor Who writer Terrance Dicks and directed by Peter Moffatt, it was first broadcast in four weekly parts on BBC1 from 22 November to 13 December 1980. The serial is the second of a loosely connected trilogy set in the universe of E-Space, and follows the Fourth Doctor (Tom Baker), his companion Romana (Lalla Ward), and stowaway Adric (Matthew Waterhouse) land on a planet where a medieval village is controlled from a tower by the Three Who Rule, three vampiric lords who descend from the crew of a crashed Earth spacecraft.

Dicks originally outlined State of Decay in 1977 for the show's fifteenth season, under the title The Witch Lords, before it was shelved by the BBC. Incoming producer John Nathan-Turner revived the concept and commissioned new scripts from Dicks, who often came into conflict with new script editor Christopher H. Bidmead over the latter's insistence on adding more science fiction elements to the story. Nathan-Turner chose Peter Moffatt, an experienced director with a reputation for punctuality, to direct. Filming for the serial began in April 1980 at Burnham Beeches in Buckinghamshire and continued at the BBC TV Centre throughout May. The shoot was marred by tension between the cast, particularly as a result of Waterhouse shooting his first serial and problems between Ward and Baker due to their romantic relationship. Several model shots were used for the serial, while Paddy Kingsland composed the score, which was recorded on synthesizers.

The serial received relatively low viewership at around five million viewers per episode, partially due to competition from ITV's concurrent airing of Buck Rogers in the 25th Century, but performed better in its Appreciation Index score. The negative depiction of vampire bats in the serial prompted outcry from some animal rights activists, including in the House of Lords. Retrospective reviews of the serial have been generally positive, with reviewers praising the serial's atmosphere, although some have criticised its visual effects and lack of originality. Dicks novelised State of Decay twice in 1981, both for in print and for a talking book adaptation

== Plot ==
Still trapped in E-Space, the Doctor and Romana land on a planet whose only settlement is a medieval village under a high tower, from where the vampiric Three Who Rule regularly select villagers to be brough to them. The Doctor learns from villager Ivo that science is forbidden in the village. On their way out, they are ambushed by an band of rebels, led by scientist Kalmar. They show the Doctor ancient technology they have recovered detailing the crew of the Hydrax, a spaceship from Earth, and its crew, whom former guard Tarak recognizes as the Three Who Rule. Meanwhile, Adric, who has stowed away on the TARDIS, walks into the village and is sheltered by Ivo for the night.

On their way back, the Doctor and Romana are attacked by bats and led to the tower. There they meet lords Zargo and Camilla, who claim they protect the villagers. The Doctor protests that their society has backslid under their rule. Aukon, the last of the three lords, selects Adric from among the villagers and brings him a cave under the tower to become the first of the "chosen ones." Left alone, the Doctor and Romana find an inspection shaft and reach the flight deck of the Hydrax, where they discover fuel tanks filled with blood and hear a loud heartbeat. Aukon discovers them, leading the Doctor to realize the Three Who Rule are the original crew, not their descendants.

Tarak rescues the two, and leaves with Romana to rescue Adric, while the Doctor heads to the TARDIS, where he discovers that the vampires are an ancient enemy of the Time Lords. In the vampire crypt, Romana finds Adric in a trance. Zargo and Camilla awaken, killing Tarak and taking Romana prisoner as a sacrifice for the upcoming "arising." The Doctor lands in the rebel bunker and rouses them to attack the tower. Using a scanner, they discover a giant vampire creature under the tower.

The rebels attack the throne room. The Doctor finds the control for one of the Hydrax's scout ships and programs a flight path. In the cave below, Aukon calls on the giant vampire, the Great One, to arise and drink the blood of the sacrifice. The rebels evacuate as the scout ship takes off, waking Romana. As the claws of the Great One emerge from the ground, the scout ship turns back around and strikes the giant vampire through the heart, killing it. The Three Who Rule age rapidly and crumble into dust. The Doctor helps the rebels repair their computer and leaves to bring Adric home and find a way out of E-Space.

== Production ==
=== Conception and writing ===
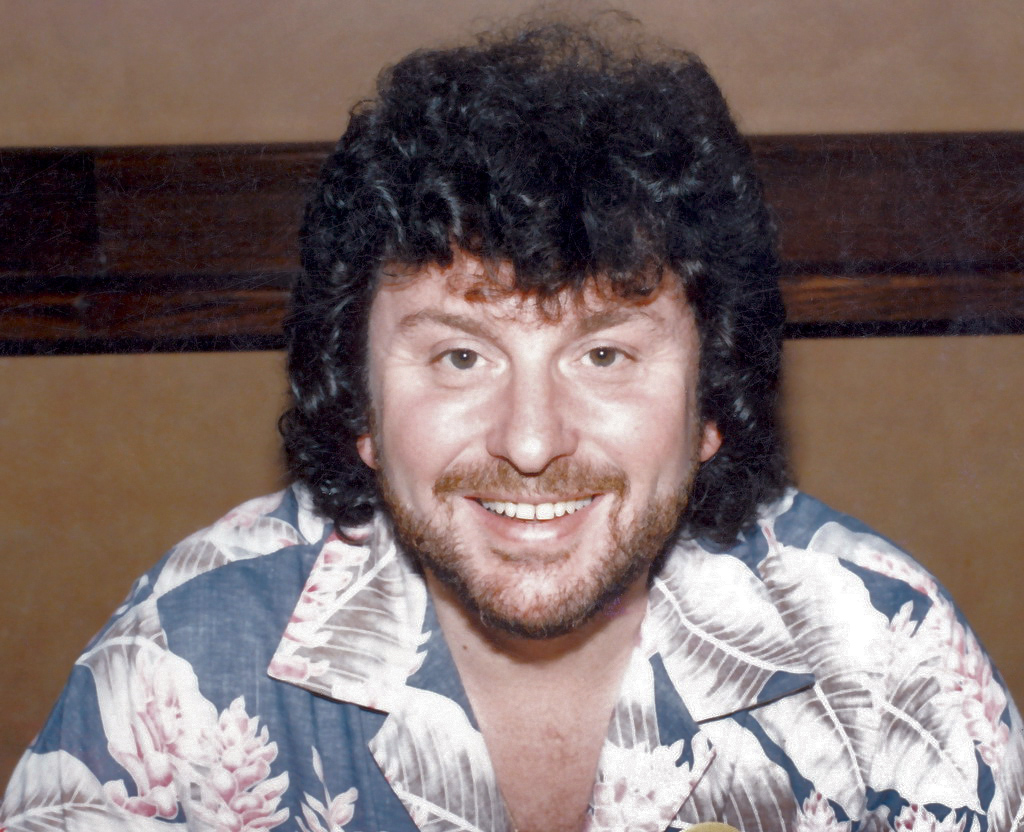
John Nathan-Turner (pictured) revived Terrance Dicks's idea for a vampire-centered serial upon taking the reins as producer in 1979.

State of Decay originated in January 1977, when script editor Robert Holmes asked Terrance Dicks to write a storyline that would start off Doctor Who's upcoming fifteenth season. Both Holmes and Dicks had written Gothic-inspired serials for prior seasons, and Dicks revived a prior idea to write a Dracula-like vampire story in a science-fiction setting, which he originally titled The Witch Lords. Dicks was also simultaneously commissioned to write a novelization of the serial, to be released by Target Books. The original draft of the serial featured then-companion Leela, and saw the Doctor landing on a medieval-like planet ruled by vampiric nobles where the peasants roamed at night as zombies. Dicks submitted the script for the first episode of the serial, renamed The Vampire Mutations, on 25 January. Shortly after, BBC Head of Serials Graeme McDonald vetoed the storyline's production, fearing that the serial would be perceived as a spoof of the BBC's upcoming adaptation of Stoker's novel. Holmes commissioned Dicks to write Horror of Fang Rock as a replacement.

Dicks's script was revived in December 1979, when incoming producer John Nathan-Turner discovered that his predecessor Graham Williams had left behind almost no scripts that could be used for the series' eighteenth season. Knowing Dicks had written for the series before, Nathan-Turner first commissioned a revised outline to be due by the end of the month, followed by the scripts for the serial, to be due in February. While rewriting the scripts, Dicks came into conflict with Christopher H. Bidmead, the new script editor, who sought to place more emphasis on hard science and disapproved of Dicks's reworking of Dracula. Bidmead, disliking the Hammer horror-like tone of the first draft, encouraged Dicks to write the vampires as scientists and to focus the story more on the conflict between superstition and science, while Dicks wished to portray the vampires more in line with traditional horror clichés. Bidmead's influence led Dicks to devise the conceit of the vampires' castle originally being a crashed spaceship. The two both collaborated to add the element of the underground band of scientists to the script.

Bidmead also ordered Dicks to incorporate two new elements of continuity into the script, the new companion Adric and the storyline of the TARDIS being trapped in the smaller universe of E-Space. Dicks felt the concept of E-Space was never fully explained to him, and was equally unsure about how to involve Adric, having been given little direction and great liberty with writing him. Although the serial was initially planned to air second in the season, it was moved further up to allow for Adric's introduction. Bidmead vetoed the title The Vampire Mutation, feeling the audience should not know immediately that the villains were vampires. To Dicks's displeasure, Bidmead renamed the serial The Wasting, although this was changed to State of Decay during filming, as Dicks feared negative reviews making puns on the serial "wasting" viewers' time.

Dicks's scripts were approved on 12 March 1980. Despite this, Bidmead and Nathan-Turner requested rewrites to tone down the horror aspects of Dicks' scripts, and encouraged Dicks to incorporate scientific elements like a discussion of Grimm's law, which the writer felt slowed the story. Dicks, feeling that the character of K9 had been sidelined in previous stories, wrote a larger part for the character in Part Four. He included several in-jokes at Bidmead's expense, including the Doctor's comment comparing the TARDIS, which Bidmead wanted the show to use more actively, to a bus. More technological elements were introduced in further rewrites on 3 April. On April 11, McDonald demanded further rewrites of scenes he deemed too frightening, including the death of the vampires and several instances of violence.

=== Cast and crew ===
Nathan-Turner approached Peter Moffatt, with whom he had worked on All Creatures Great and Small, about directing the serial, as the director was well known for his punctuality and careful planning that ensured shortened shoots. Moffatt accepted on 10 March based on Dicks's scripts, and was disappointed to find that Bidmead had encouraged him to tone down the horror elements. After he complained to Nathan-Turner, Moffatt was given permission to film an older version of the script with more of Dicks's stylistic elements intact, removing some of Bidmead's ideas, one of which was to have the vampires hatch from eggs. Amy Roberts, who had previously worked on Image of the Fendahl, was chosen as costume designer, alternating between serials with June Hudson. A former assistant, Norma Hill, was selected as make-up designer, while Tony Harding, who had worked on two previous serials as well as the BBC's Count Dracula, came on to design the visual effects. Christine Ruscoe, who had designed sets for Pyramids of Mars and The Hand of Fear, was chosen as the serial's set designer.

Matthew Waterhouse, an emerging actor who was a fan of the show, was cast as Adric by the end of March, having been recommended to Nathan-Turner by two sources. Although differing from the production team's idea of Adric, Waterhouse's audition impressed the team, who contracted him on 3 April for at least 20 episodes. Nathan-Turner took Waterhouse to lunch afterwards to assure that the actor was not a member of the Doctor Who Appreciation Society. Moffatt avoided Nathan-Turner's usual practice of casting big-name actors in guest roles, instead opting for character actors such as Arthur Hewlett as Kalmar. Moffatt chose to cast actors trained in theatre rather than television as the Three Who Rule to produce deliberately exaggerated performances and stylized vocality, which he described as "ham Shakespeare," eventually choosing Emrys James, Rachel Davies, and William Lindsay. He directed the three actors to move elegantly and ballet-like, to further the contrast with the naturalistic performances of the peasants. Welsh actor Clinton Greyn was cast as Ivo, while Rhoda Lewis was cast as Marta. Hewlett, James, and Greyn had all previously worked with Moffatt.

=== Design and effects ===
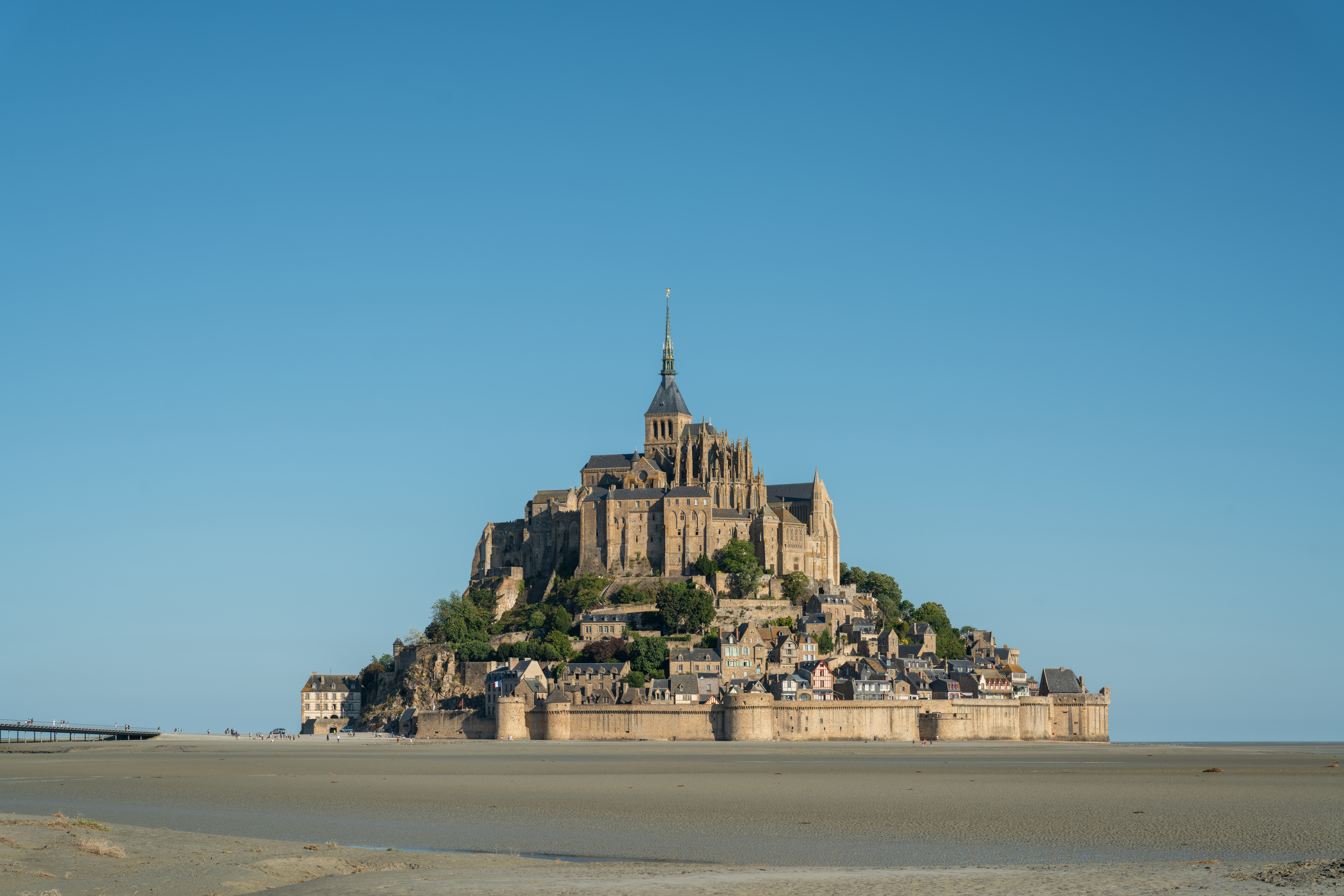
Set designer Christine Ruscoe took visual inspiration for the tower from Mont-Saint-Michel in France.

Dicks, conscious of budget limitations, capped the number of sets to be used in the serial at eleven, including the TARDIS interior, which was augmented with a new door and printer. Despite being referred to as rococo in the story, Ruscoe drew on Saxon and Romanesque architecture for the vampire planet. Ruscoe designed a set for the entrance to the tower that could be modified to depict either the view looking out or the view looking in. Inspired by Mont-Saint-Michel, her concept for the tower's interior was that the walls would be made of copper that had corroded to partially resemble stone. However, the end result resembled wood, which provoked an on-set argument with Bidmead. Some parts of the set were made from repainted elements from BBC2's Not the Nine O'Clock News. Ruscoe carefully structured the rebel hideout set to disguise its size, and featured a monitor from one of the BBC's Ceefax machines as part of a scanner prop. The largest set was the cave, which was further complicated by the need for blue screens and hidden tubes for dry ice. To give the throne room the illusion of size, Moffatt commissioned a glass painting for the top of the set.

Although Adric's first appearance would be in the prior serial, Full Circle, State of Decay was to be produced first. Costume designer Amy Roberts therefore had to design a uniform for Adric in line with Full Circle's script for State of Decay, as Nathan-Turner wanted consistent costuming for each cast member. For Romana's costume, Lalla Ward was given a beige hunting suit with a wool waistcoat, white shirt, and black necktie. A white nightgown with gold trim inspired by Hammer films was also designed for the scene in which the vampires attempt to sacrifice Romana. The vampire costumes were made from padded velvet and were given jagged capes to suggest the appearance of bat wings. A vampire-like costume made of the same material was also designed for Adric. For the vampire make-up, designer Norma Hill applied foundation to pale the actors' faces with red highlights around the eyes on and on the lips. Acrylic teeth were used for the fangs. Due to Tom Baker's poor health, his hair had to be permed by the make-up department.

Most of the visual effects for the serial consisted of model work, principally of the vampire tower and ship. Tony Harding built a four-foot model of the tower out of polyester and filmed it for several establishing shots on 35mm film, fitting the model tower and village with small wired lights for realism. Due to a lack of time for model filming, priority was given to night shots, as they were the most difficult to light. Harding also built a model scout ship fitted with a Schermuly rocket for the scene of the rocket blasting off. Shots of the model rocket flying were accomplished with wires. Due to lack of space, the model had to be kept in the studio during filming with actors. A model of the underground chamber where the Great Vampire emerges was built with layered plaster over a platform with a hole in it, through which effects assistant Chris Lawson pushed his gloved hand. A red light was added under the set to suggest the Great Vampire's energy. Two versions of the Great Vampire were attempted, one as a costumed extra and one as a mechanical puppet. Moffatt decided against the former and chose to include the latter, albeit seen distorted through Kalmar's scanner. To produce the prop bats, Harding modified bird toys with flapping wings, which the effects team refashioned to be self-powered. A scene of a bat landing on Romana's neck was performed by pulling the prop bat away on wires and reversing the footage. The effects of the vampires rapidly aging were done in nine stages, the first five of which comprised increasing layers of prosthetics, followed by the use of dummies and vacuum pumps to show the vampires crumbling to dust.

=== Filming ===
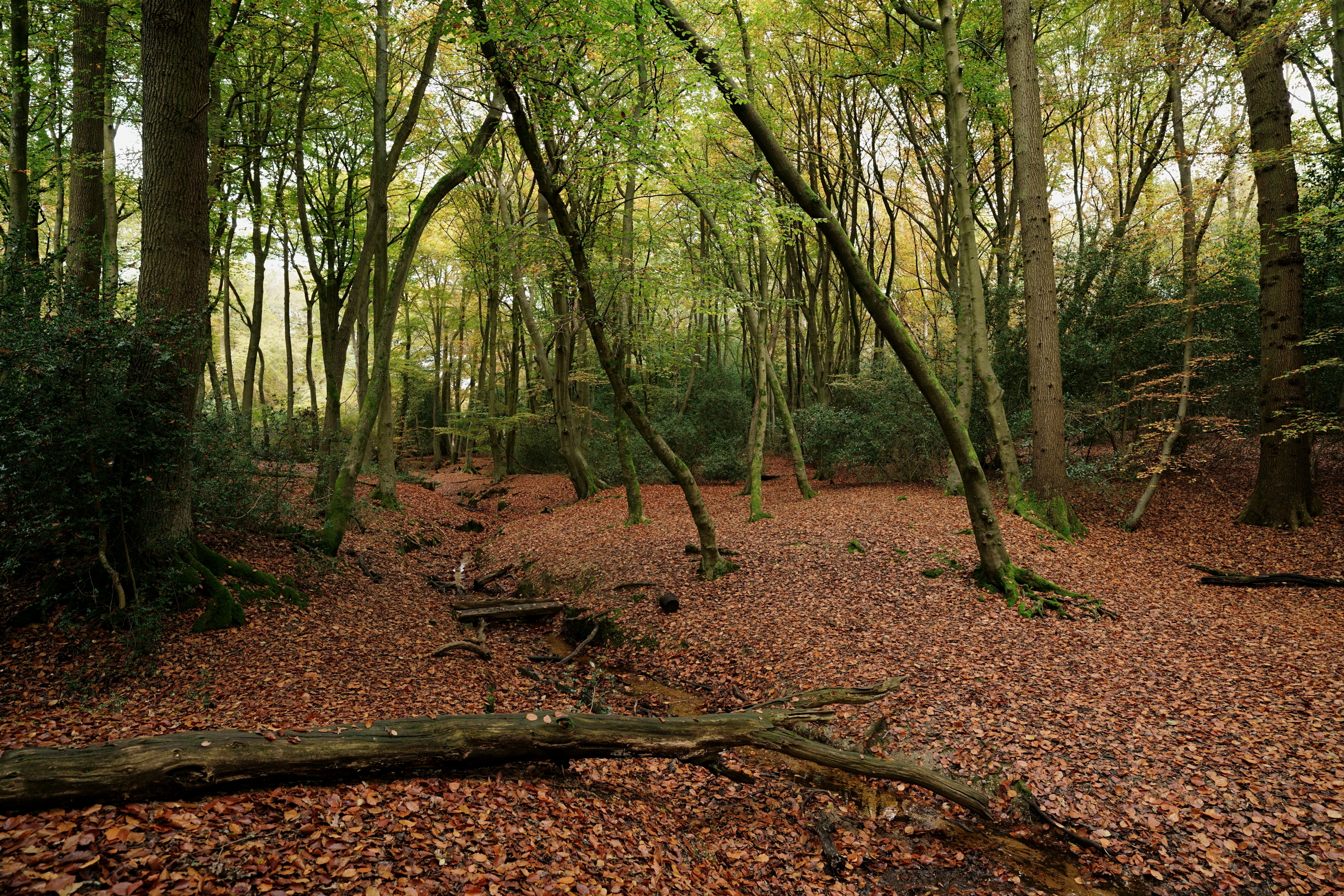
Production began with location filming at Burnham Beeches in Buckinghamshire (pictured) to depict exteriors on the vampire planet.

Production began with location filming on 30 April and 1 May at Burnham Beeches in Buckinghamshire with Baker and Ward alongside Iain Rattray as Habris and Thane Bettany as Tarak. Baker was ill and initially abrasive towards Moffatt, as he was new to the show, until Moffatt gave Baker helpful acting suggestions. The first shoot day consisted of day for night shots, using a dark filter over the camera. The second day saw the filming of the rest of Part One's cliffhanger, as well as the Doctor and Romana encountering the rebels. At Baker's suggestion, the Doctor's wound was depicted oozing blue blood. When Nathan-Turner saw the footage, he initially ordered the scene reshot, but due to time constraints simply ordered a close-up on the blood removed. The bat attack was completed on 2 May, after which footage was shot on a ventilation tower's ladder to depict an inspection shaft.

Studio rehearsals began 6 May at the BBC TV Centre, marking Waterhouse's first day on the show. Waterhouse was sent home from rehearsal as he had not joined the actor's union Equity, which was resolved that night. While rehearsing the speech the Doctor gives to the rebels, Baker ad-libbed lines from Henry V, which were subsequently written into the script. The vampire ship was initially called the Hyperion, but during rehearsals was renamed the Hydrax, as the former name had been used previously in the 1972 serial The Mutants. Studio recording began on 15 May in Studio 3 of the TV Centre. During this first session, a dispute over an invoice led to Nigel Brackley, the usual operator for the K9 prop, being replaced with Mat Irvine. The crew first recorded scenes set in the rebel headquarters, followed by those in the scoutship control room. More rehearsals followed from 19 May, during which more elements, like the reference to an old Gallifreyan hermit, were added. Recording continued from 29 to 31 May in studio 6, beginning with shots in the throne room, followed by scenes in the sleeping vault and the tower corridors. While filming with a prop dagger during the session, Waterhouse dropped the prop and cut his leg with it. Stuart Fell and Alan Chuntz coordinated the stunts for the session, including hand-to-hand combat and Tarak being thrown across the room. On the final day, Baker insisted on saying the word "herbs" with an American pronunciation, despite Moffatt's protest. The model effects were filmed between the studio sessions, on 20 and 21 May, as well as on 4 June.

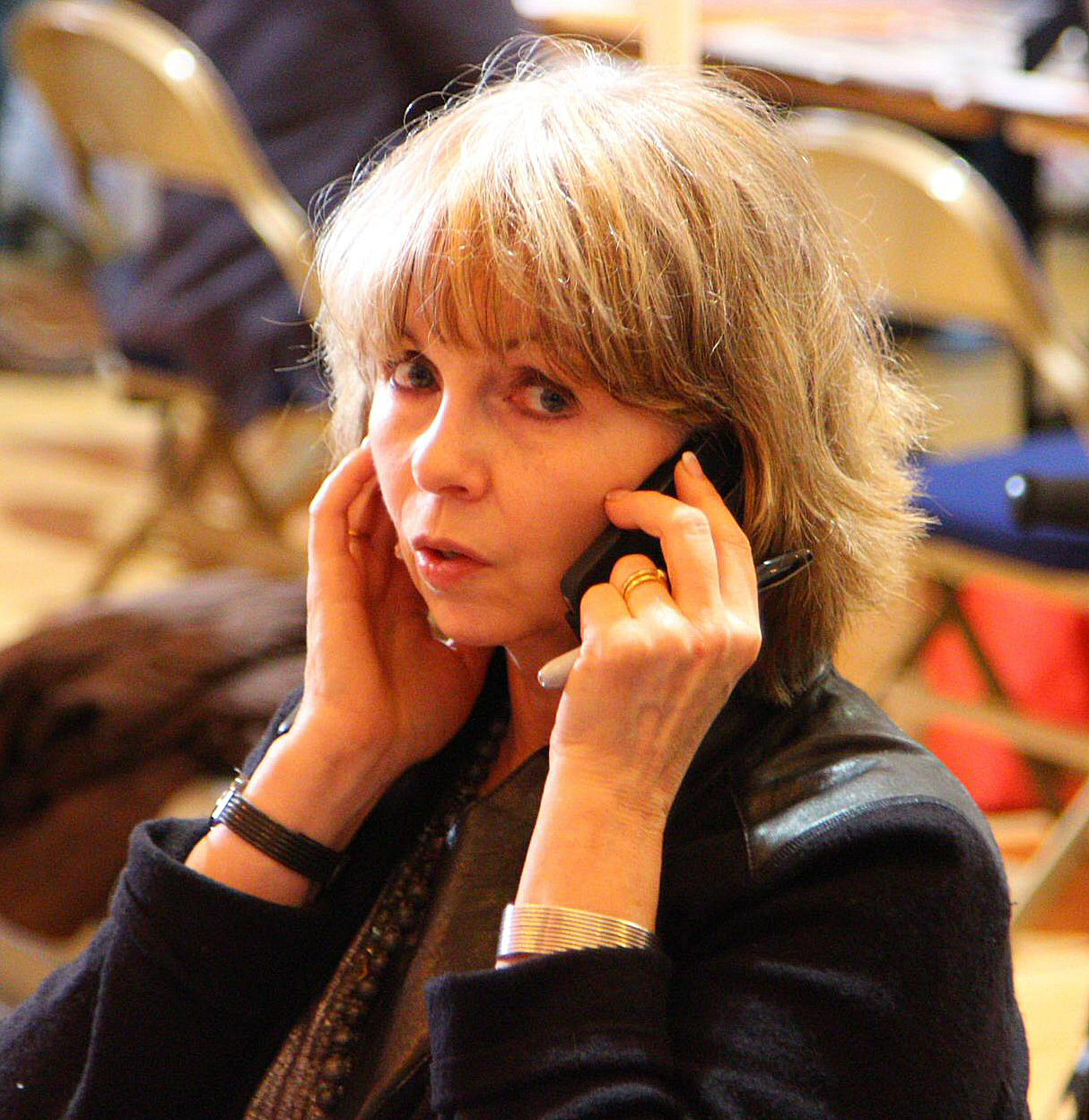
Filming was complicated by the difficult relationship between co-stars Tom Baker and Lalla Ward (pictured in 2014).

Filming was beset with conflict among the production team, mostly among the main cast. Baker, who was also ill, and Ward were in an increasingly fraught relationship at the time, and kept almost entirely separate between takes. Waterhouse remembers being told on his first day bout the "blue corner" and "red corner" the set was divided into between them by Moffatt. While recording a scene in which the Doctor and Romana climb down from a ladder, Baker responded to Moffatt's suggestion that the Doctor help Romana down by saying Ward could do it herself. However, Ward and Baker grew closer again during the shoot, and began plans to marry. Ward also began planning to leave the series during the serial's filming. Waterhouse's presence and inexperience led to further conflict. On the first day of rehearsal, Waterhouse made a poor impression on Baker by giving him advice on the scene. Waterhouse remembered Baker telling him to "piss off" after he introduced himself. In response, Waterhouse tore down his poster of Baker upon arriving home. Although Baker was kinder to Waterhouse during the next day of rehearsals, Waterhouse felt he continued being difficult to work with. On the final day, he confronted Baker vulgarly, which Baker responded to by keeping quiet for the rest of the day. Ward was annoyed with the young actor, believing he did not realize his luck in booking the role, and at one point had to intervene in an argument between Waterhouse and Amy Roberts over the actor wearing his costume to lunch.

=== Post-production ===
Editing for the serial began on 3 June, using Quantel equipment for visual effects like the green tint of E-Space, the orange color of the planet, and superimposed footage of bats, which came from Animal Marvels: Frontiers of Life, a BBC-Universal nature documentary, and the BBC Natural History Film Unit. The second episode originally ended with a reveal of the tanks of blood as a cliffhanger but was lengthened to end on Aukon's arrival, as the episode ran too short. An additional scene of Tarak rescuing Romana and the Doctor was removed from Part Three.

At Moffatt's request, sound designer Dick Mills created a chittering noise for the bats using a synthesizer. Mills recorded his own voice and slowed it to depict the Great Vampire's death. To keep continuity with Full Circle, Tom Baker dubbed a line over the end of Part Four about taking Adric back to his home planet of Alzarius. Paddy Kingsland, who alternated with Peter Howell throughout the season, composed the serial's score. Kingsland had previously composed the score for The Hitchhiker's Guide to the Galaxy on BBC Radio 4 and used a similar range of synthesizers for State of Decay.

== Broadcast and reception ==
Episode	Title	Run time	Original release date	UK viewers (millions)
1	"Part One"	22:24	22 November 1980	5.8
2	"Part Two"	23:16	29 November 1980	5.3
3	"Part Three"	24:13	6 December 1980	4.4
4	"Part Four"	24:54	13 December 1980	5.4

State of Decay was broadcast on BBC One in four weekly parts from 22 November to 13 December 1980. Like the rest of season 18, the serial saw relatively low viewership at around five million per episode. Part of the reason for this was competition from ITV, which concurrently broadcast the American series Buck Rogers in the 25th Century. As a whole, the serial received an Appreciation Score of 67 out of 100 from audiences. The BBC advertised the serial with a 40-second trailer the evening prior to Part One's broadcast. An interview with guest actor Emrys James ran in The Sun on 22 November, in which he discussed working with Tom Baker. Various press items about the series as a whole were published as the serial aired, including about Ward and Baker's marriage on 13 December, the date of Part Four's broadcast.

A Doctor Who exhibit at Madame Tussauds was advertised after the broadcasts of the first three episodes, while the end of Part Four announced the airdate of the next serial in January. The serial was sold overseas in New Zealand and North America the following year, to Australia in 1982, to Canada in 1983, and to Saudi Arabia, Taiwan, and the United Arab Emirates later in the decade. It was shown again on UK Gold in 1994, airing in production order between The Leisure Hive and Meglos.

=== Reception ===
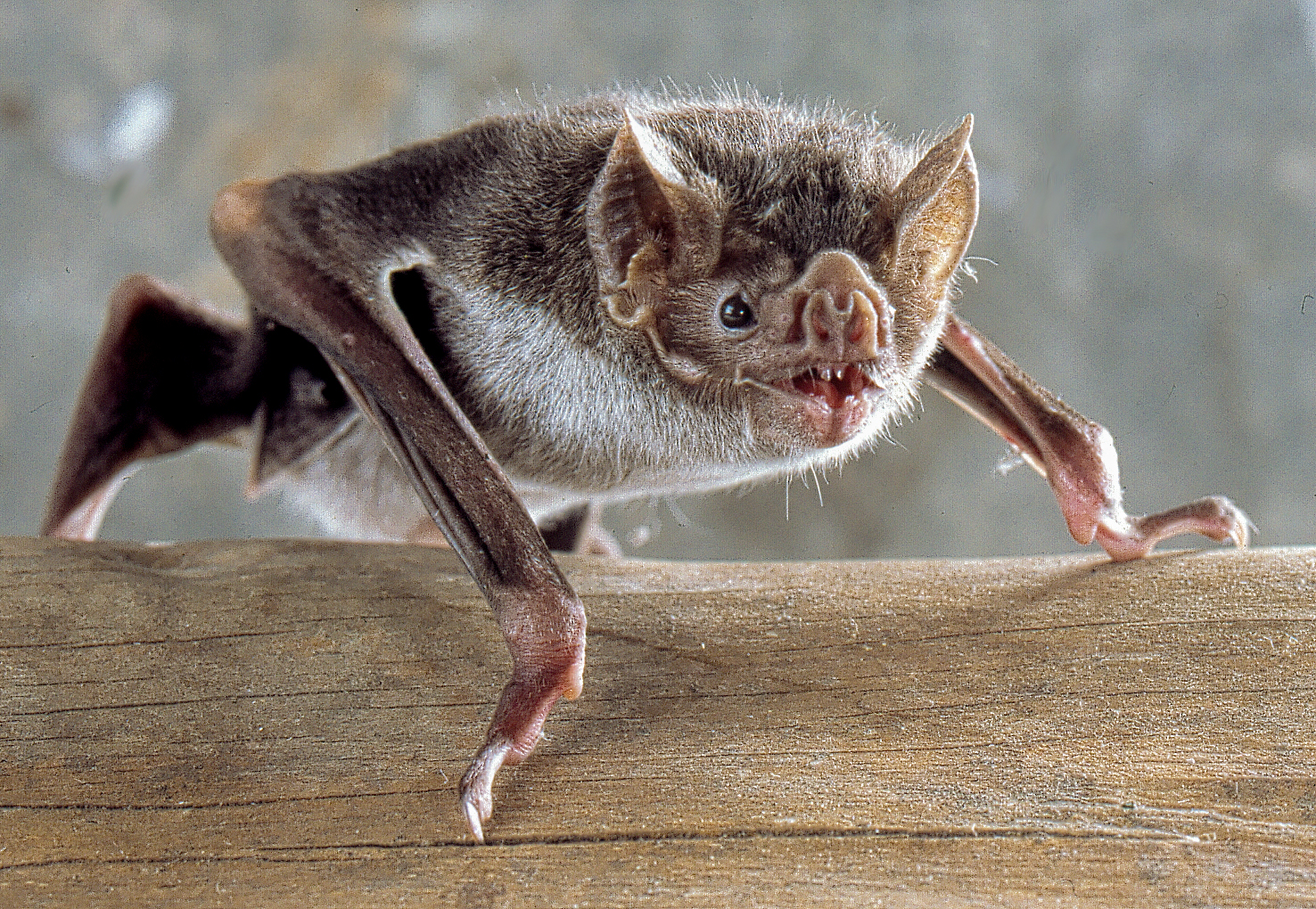
The serial's negative portrayal of vampire bats prompted ouctry among some animal rights activists, including a speech in the House of Lords.

State of Decay has received generally positive reviews both contemporarily and retrospectively. A 6 December review by Stanley Eveling in The Scotsman called the serial "good ghoulish entertainment for all ages." The serial's portrayal of vampire bats, an endangered species, prompted some controversy from animal rights groups. The Royal Society for the Prevention of Cruelty to Animals and the Institute for Terrestrial Ecology both requested that the serial include a voiceover to refute the image of vampire bats as villainous, while a 4 December speech in the House of Lords by Lord Melchett cited the serial as containing a harmful portrayal of the species as dangerous to humans.

In a retrospective review for Radio Times, Mark Braxton gave State of Decay four out of five stars, calling it among Dicks's best scripts. He praised the design and production values, the rapport between Baker and Ward, and called it a "throwback" to the Hinchcliffe and Holmes era, although he criticised Aukon, Camilla and Zargo, the bat effects, and the representation of the Great One. Writing for The Guardian in 2019, Toby Hadoke described it as "a clever meld of vampire legend and science fiction". Lance Parkin considered the serial "fun, but extremely straightforward," and an example of the "mixed bag" of Season 18.

Lawrence Miles and Tat Wood applauded State of Decay as understanding "the connection between Doctor Who and a vastly older style of storytelling," comparing the serial to a traditional "curfew" story about the need for children to hide indoors after dark, writing that it "demands that the viewers huddle together in a warm, TV-lit space." They criticised the serial for the quality of its model shots and Matthew Waterhouse's performance. They situate the story historically as a hybrid between the 1970s style of TV costume-drama writing common in previous seasons and the "proto-New Romantic" visual style of the show in the 1980s. In Doctor Who: The Complete Guide, Mark Campbell gave it six out of ten, describing it as a "limply directed vampire tale that doesn't really gel". Believing that the horror and vampirism should be more explicit, he thought the production team made a mistake in not wanting to "plagiarise Hammer". In A Critical History of Doctor Who on Television, John Kenneth Muir also considered the serial a "disappointment", regarding it as unoriginal in its use of vampire clichés and elements of previous stories.

== Commercial releases ==
=== In print ===
Doctor Who and the State of Decay
- Author: Terrance Dicks
- Cover artist: Andrew Skilleter
- Series: Doctor Who book: Target novelisations
- Release number: 58
- Publisher: Target Books
- Publication date: September 1981 (Hardback) 14 January 1982 (Paperback)
- ISBN: 0-426-20133-7

Terrance Dicks novelised his scripts for the serial as Doctor Who and the State of Decay, although, due to a royalty dispute between the BBC and publisher W. H. Allen, its publication was delayed to September 1981. A Target Books paperback edition followed in January 1982. An audiobook version was released in 2016, read by Geoffrey Beevers and John Leeson. A separate 55-minute talking book version was produced by Pickwick International from an abridged version of Dicks's scripts. Narrated by Tom Baker, it was released on cassette tape in June 1981 and was reissued by Ditto in 1985.

=== Home media ===
State of Decay was released on VHS in November 1997 as part of a set called The E-Space Trilogy, which was later released on DVD in January 2009. The DVD version featured a commentary by Waterhouse, Dicks, and Moffatt, as well as a making-of documentary entitled The Vampire Lovers: The Making of State of Decay, among other features and production notes. It was also released in issue 86 of Doctor Who – DVD Files in 2012. The sound effects for the bats were released on the BBC LP and cassette Sci-Fi Sound Effects No. 6 in 1981, which was reissued as Essential Science Fiction Sound Effects Vol 1. in 1992 and under the original title in 2013. In 2005, The Stamp Centre issued covers for the serial, which Baker and Ward signed.

== Works cited ==
- Anghelides, Peter; Richards, Justin, eds. (1994). "State of Decay: The Making of a Television Drama Series". In-Vision. No. 49.
- Miles, Lawrence; Wood, Tat (2004). About Time 5: The Unauthorized Guide to Doctor Who (Seasons 18 to 21). Mad Norwegian Press. ISBN 0-9759446-4-9.
- Muir, John Kenneth (1999). A Critical History of Doctor Who on Television. McFarland & Company. ISBN 9780786437160.
- Parkin, Lance (2009). Time Unincorporated: The Doctor Who Fanzine Archives. Vol. 1. Mad Norwegian Press. ISBN 9781935234012.
- Wright, Mark, ed. (2017). State of Decay, Warriors' Gate, The Keeper of Traken, Logopolis. Doctor Who: The Complete History. Vol. 33. London: Panini Comics, Hachette Partworks. ISSN 2057-6048.
