= Sophie, Duchess of Edinburgh =

Member of the British royal family (born 1965)

Sophie
- Duchess of Edinburgh (more)
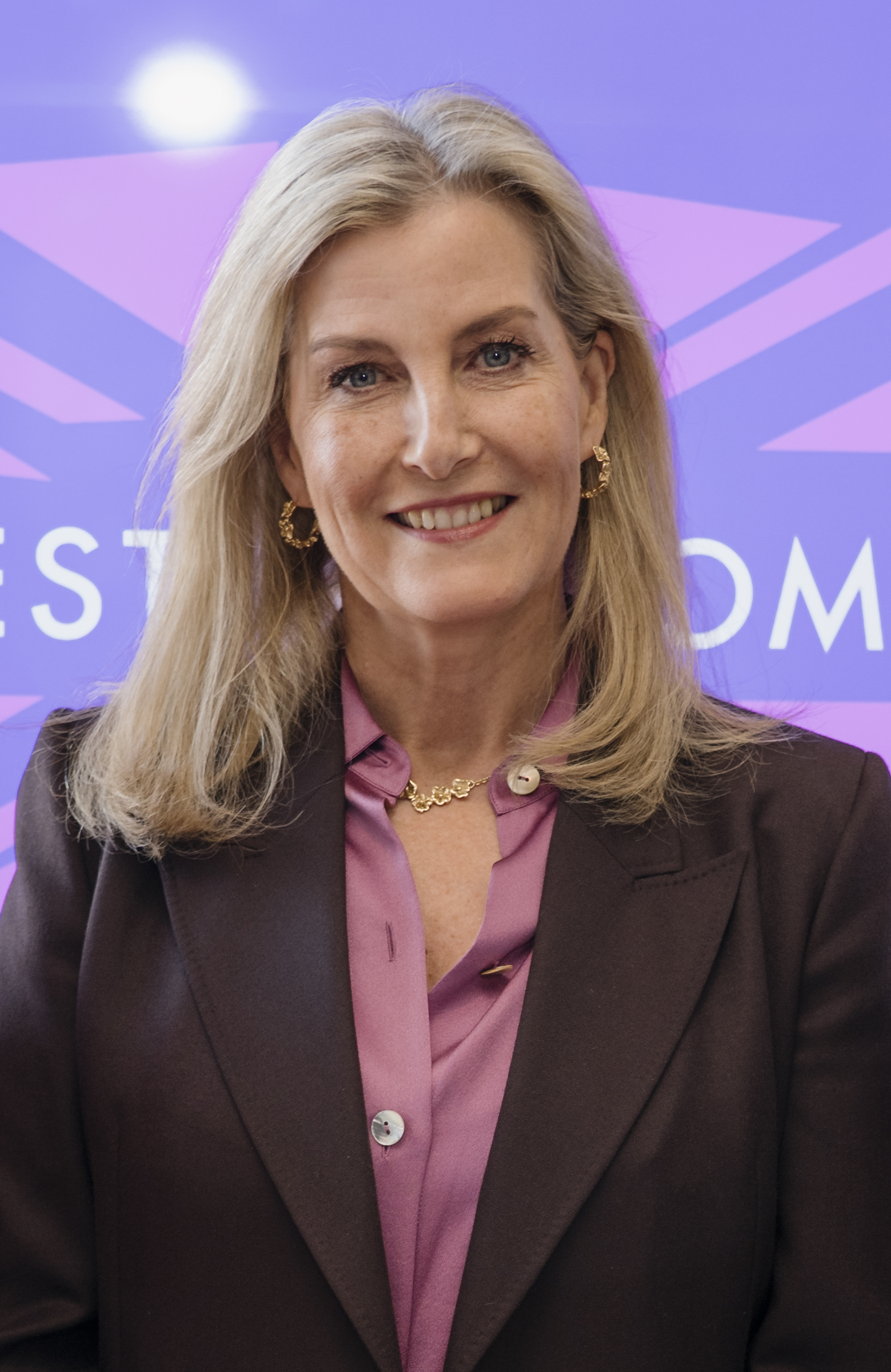
- Sophie in 2025
- Born: Sophie Helen Rhys-Jones; 20 January 1965 (age 61); Radcliffe Infirmary, Oxford, England
- Spouse: Prince Edward, Duke of Edinburgh (m. 1999)
- Issue: Lady Louise Mountbatten-Windsor; James Mountbatten-Windsor, Earl of Wessex
- House: Windsor (by marriage)
- Father: Christopher Rhys-Jones
- Mother: Mary O'Sullivan
- Education: West Kent College

Sophie, Duchess of Edinburgh (born Sophie Helen Rhys-Jones; 20 January 1965), is a member of the British royal family. She is married to Prince Edward, Duke of Edinburgh, the youngest sibling of King Charles III.

Sophie grew up in Brenchley, Kent, and later attended West Kent College, training as a secretary. She then worked in public relations, representing firms across the UK, Switzerland and Australia before opening her own agency in 1996. She met Edward in 1987 while working for Capital Radio; they began dating in 1993. Their engagement was announced in January 1999, and they married on 19 June 1999 at St George's Chapel, Windsor Castle. The couple have a daughter, Louise, and a son, James.

In 2002, Sophie closed her business interests and began full-time work as a member of the royal family. She is the patron of over 70 charities and organisations, including Childline and the London College of Fashion. Her charity work primarily revolves around people with disabilities, women's rights, avoidable blindness and agriculture.

== Early life and career ==
Sophie Helen Rhys-Jones was born on 20 January 1965 at Radcliffe Infirmary, Oxford, into a middle-class family. Her father, Christopher Bournes Rhys-Jones (born 1931), is a retired sales director for an importer of industrial tyres and rubber goods. Her mother was Mary (née O'Sullivan; 1934–2005), a charity worker and secretary. She has an elder brother, David (born 1963), and was named after her father's sister, Helen, who died in a riding accident in 1960. Her godfather, actor Thane Bettany, was her father's stepbrother; both men spent their early life in Sarawak, North Borneo, then a British Protectorate ruled by the White Rajahs.

She descends from King Henry IV of England and is a direct descendant of Robert Molesworth, 1st Viscount Molesworth through her grandmother, Margaret Patricia Rhys-Jones (née Molesworth; 1904–1985) who was the great-granddaughter of the Rev. John Molesworth. One of the guests at Rhys-Jones's wedding to Prince Edward in 1999 was Robert Molesworth, 12th Viscount Molesworth.

Rhys-Jones was raised in a four-bedroom 17th-century farmhouse in Brenchley, Kent. She began her education at Dulwich Preparatory School, before moving on to Kent College, Pembury, where she was friends with Sarah Sienesi, with whom she subsequently shared a flat in Fulham and who later became her lady-in-waiting. Rhys-Jones then trained as a secretary at West Kent College, Tonbridge.

She began a career in public relations, working for a variety of firms, including four years at Capital Radio, where she was assigned to the press and promotions department, as well as public relations companies The Quentin Bell Organisation and MacLaurin Communications & Media. She also worked as a ski representative in Switzerland and spent a year travelling and working in Australia. In 1996, Rhys-Jones launched her public relations agency, RJH Public Relations, which she ran with her business partner, Murray Harkin, for five years.

Prior to her marriage, Rhys-Jones lived at Coleherne Court, London.

== Marriage and children ==
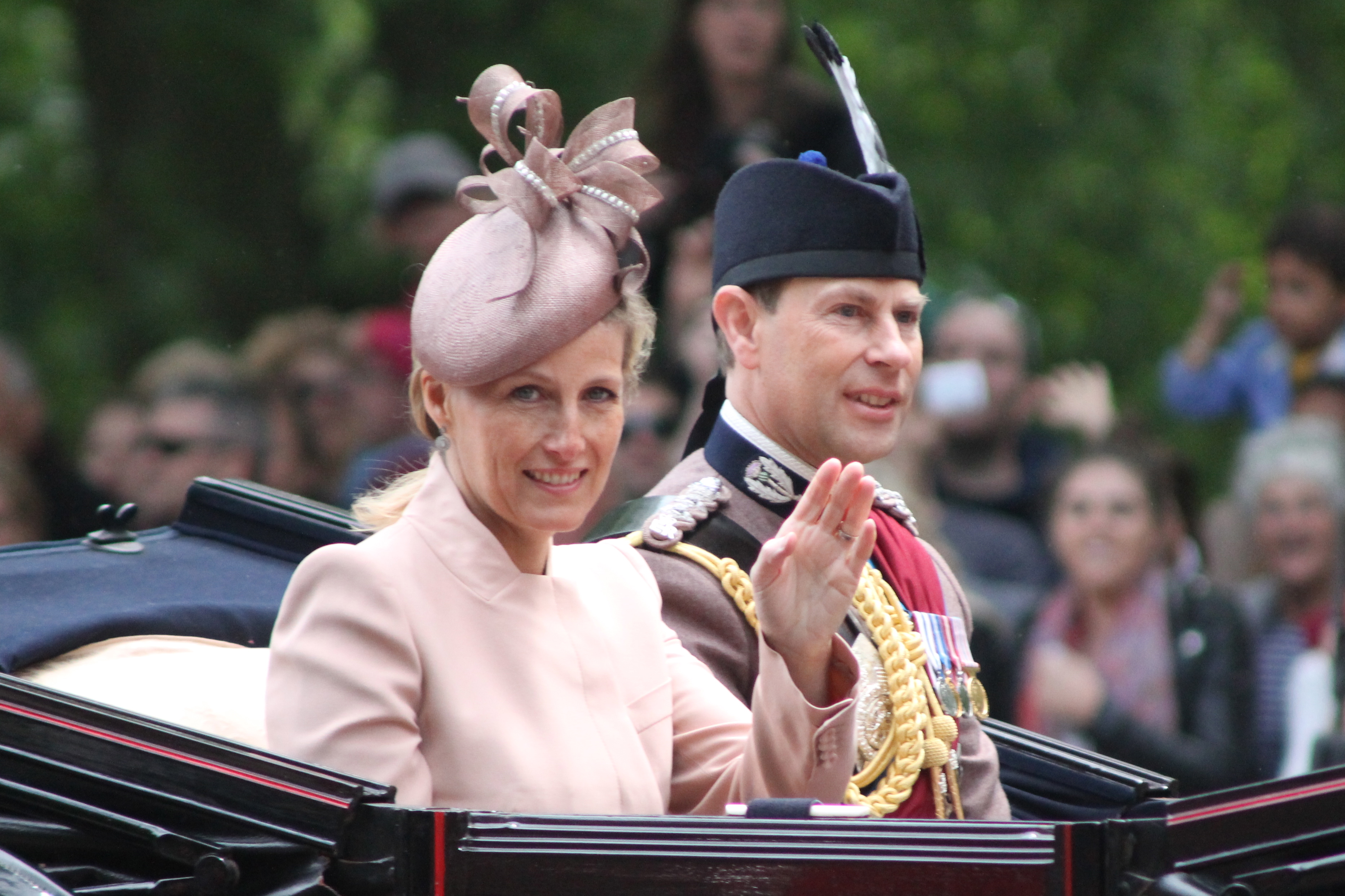
Sophie and Edward at Trooping the Colour in London, June 2013

While working at Capital Radio, Rhys-Jones met Prince Edward, the youngest son of Queen Elizabeth II and Prince Philip, Duke of Edinburgh, for the first time in 1987 when he was dating her friend. She met him again at a promotion shoot for the Prince Edward Summer Challenge to raise money for charity in 1993, and the two began their relationship soon afterwards. In December 1993, and amid growing speculation about whether they were planning to marry, Edward wrote a letter to newspaper editors, in which he denied any wedding plans and asked the media to respect their privacy. Edward proposed to Rhys-Jones at a vacation in the Bahamas in December 1998 and their engagement was announced on 6 January 1999. Edward proposed to her with an engagement ring featuring a two-carat oval diamond flanked by two heart-shaped gemstones set in 18-carat white gold. The ring was made by Asprey and Garrard (now Garrard & Co) and is worth an estimated £105,000. Rhys-Jones, who was reportedly close to the Queen from the beginning of her relationship with Edward, was allowed to use the royal apartments at Buckingham Palace prior to her engagement.

The wedding took place on 19 June 1999 at St George's Chapel, Windsor Castle, a break from the weddings of Edward's older siblings, which were large, formal events at Westminster Abbey or St Paul's Cathedral. On the day of their marriage, Edward was created a hereditary peer as Earl of Wessex with the subsidiary title of Viscount Severn, the latter of which derived from the Welsh roots of his wife's family. Sophie became Countess of Wessex.

The couple spent their honeymoon at Balmoral Castle. Following their union, Sophie and Edward moved to Bagshot Park, their home in Surrey. While their private residence is Bagshot Park, their office and official London residence is based at Buckingham Palace.

In December 2001, Sophie was taken to the King Edward VII Hospital after feeling unwell. It was discovered that she was suffering from an ectopic pregnancy and the foetus had to be removed. Two years later, on 8 November 2003, she prematurely gave birth to her daughter, Lady Louise, resulting from a sudden placental abruption that placed both mother and child at risk, and Sophie had to undergo an emergency caesarean section at Frimley Park Hospital, while the Earl of Wessex rushed back from Mauritius. Surrey Police were notified after Sophie started experiencing cramps, but they did not summon an ambulance because they believed one had already been called; the mistake went unnoticed for 30 minutes. The police force later apologised to Sophie for the error. She returned to Frimley Park Hospital on 17 December 2007, to give birth, again by caesarean section, to her son, James (then Viscount Severn, now Earl of Wessex).

== Public life ==
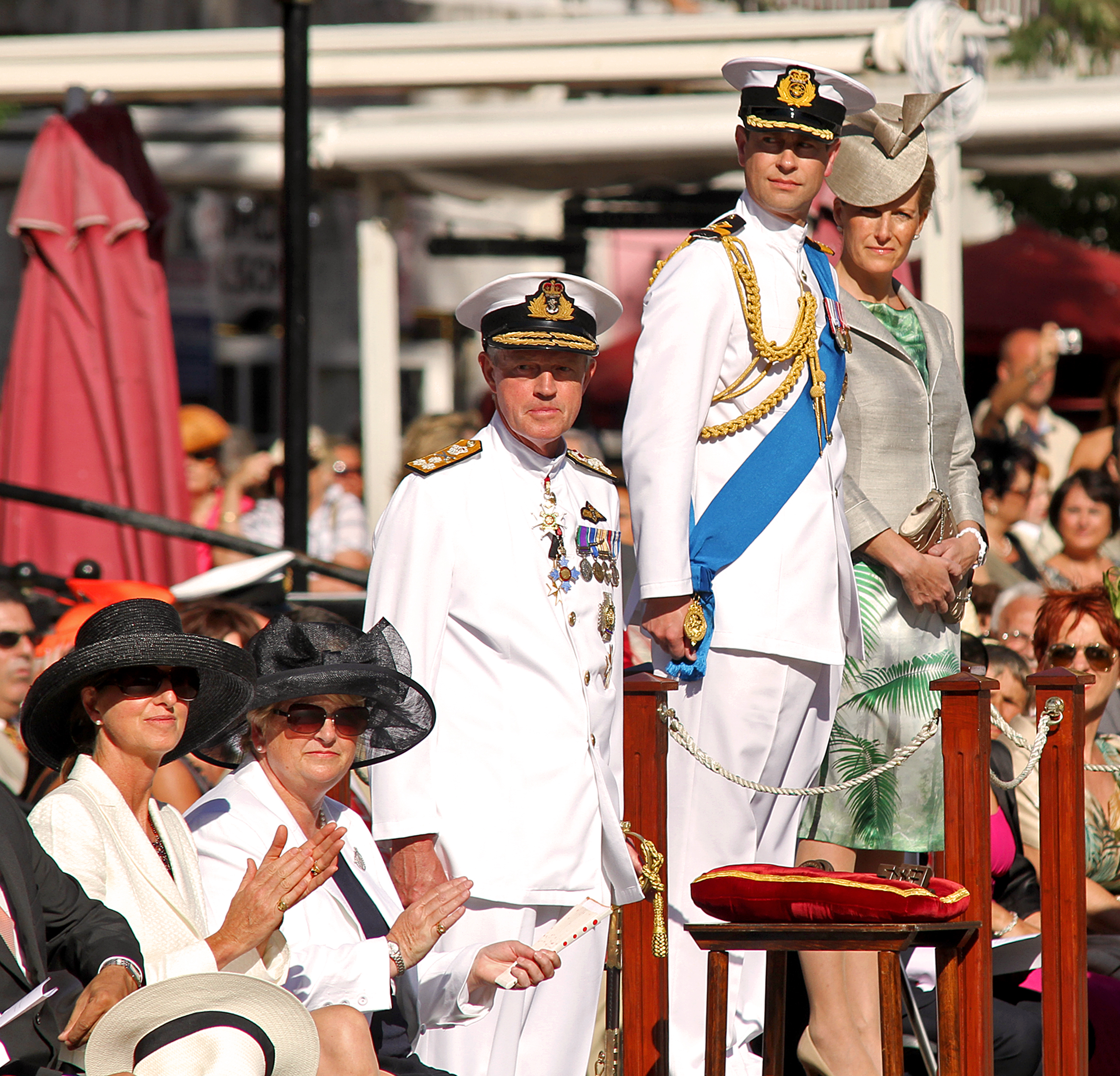
Sophie and Edward at the Queen's Birthday Parade in Gibraltar in 2012

Sophie's first overseas tour after her marriage was to the Canadian province of Prince Edward Island in 2000.

In December 2011, Sophie joined her husband visiting troops in Afghanistan. On the same trip, the royal couple visited Bahrain, and received two gifts of jewels from the Bahraini royal family and Prime Minister.

In February and March 2012, she and Edward visited the Caribbean for the Queen's Diamond Jubilee, visiting Saint Lucia, Barbados, Saint Vincent and the Grenadines, Grenada, Trinidad and Tobago, Montserrat, Saint Kitts and Nevis, Anguilla and Antigua and Barbuda. Highlights of the tour included the 50th Anniversary Independence Day celebrations in Saint Lucia, a joint address from both houses of the Barbados Parliament and a visit to sites affected by the recent volcanic eruptions in Montserrat. In June 2012, as part of the Queen's Diamond Jubilee celebrations, Edward and Sophie, represented the Queen during a three-day tour to Gibraltar. The couple attended a Queen's Birthday Parade and toured Main Street, in the historic old town.

In 2013, the couple visited South Africa. Later that year, Sophie made solo trips to India and Qatar as the patron of the sight-saving charity Orbis UK. She made a similar visit to Bangladesh in November 2017. Sophie, as Colonel-in-Chief of Corps of Army Music, visited The Countess of Wessex's String Orchestra at the Royal Artillery Barracks, in London. On 3 March 2014, the Queen approved the title of "The Countess of Wessex's String Orchestra" for the new Army String Orchestra in recognition of the Corps of Army Music's Colonel-in-Chief. In November 2014, Sophie was in Zambia representing the Queen at the state funeral of the late president of Zambia, Michael Sata.

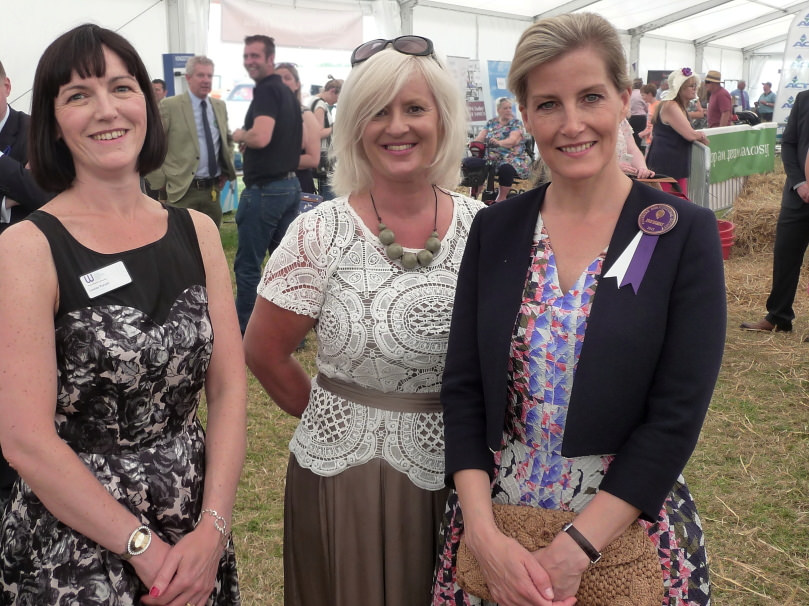
Sophie attending the Royal Cheshire County Show in 2015

On 26 March 2015, Sophie attended the reburial of Richard III of England in Leicester Cathedral. In May that year, she represented the Queen in the 70th anniversary celebrations to mark the Liberation Day of the Channel Islands. Sophie delivered a message from the Queen, who paid tribute to the island's continued allegiance and loyalty to the Crown. She visited Canada and the United States in November 2015. While in Toronto, she criss-crossed across the city, making stops at the Royal Agricultural Winter Fair and the UHN's Toronto General Hospital and Toronto Western Hospital, of which she is patron. Sophie then travelled to New York City, paying an emotional visit to the National September 11 Memorial & Museum. Sophie also made an appearance at an Armistice Day service at the Queen Elizabeth II September 11th Garden, which was opened in commemoration of the 67 British victims of the attack. Sophie later attended the 100 Women in Hedge Funds Gala dinner in Manhattan.

Sophie and Edward toured Canada in June 2016, visiting Ontario, Manitoba, Saskatchewan and Alberta. The couple visited a variety of places in and around Regina, Saskatchewan before attending the Globe Theatre's 50th anniversary gala.

In March 2017, Sophie embarked on a 4-day visit to Malawi as Vice-Patron of The Queen Elizabeth Diamond Jubilee Trust, visiting programmes to end avoidable blindness and champion young leaders. On 9 May 2017, she attended King Harald and Queen Sonja of Norway's 80th Birthday Celebrations on behalf of the royal family. Sophie and Edward represented the Queen at celebrations for the Golden Jubilee of Hassanal Bolkiah in October 2017. On 30 November 2017, Sophie visited the 'Making for Change' fashion training and manufacturing unit, a fashion training and manufacturing unit established by the Ministry of Justice and London College of Fashion at HM Prison Downview as patron of the London College of Fashion During her visit, she met staff and prisoners, including female inmates, and awarded participants with certificates as part of their training programme.

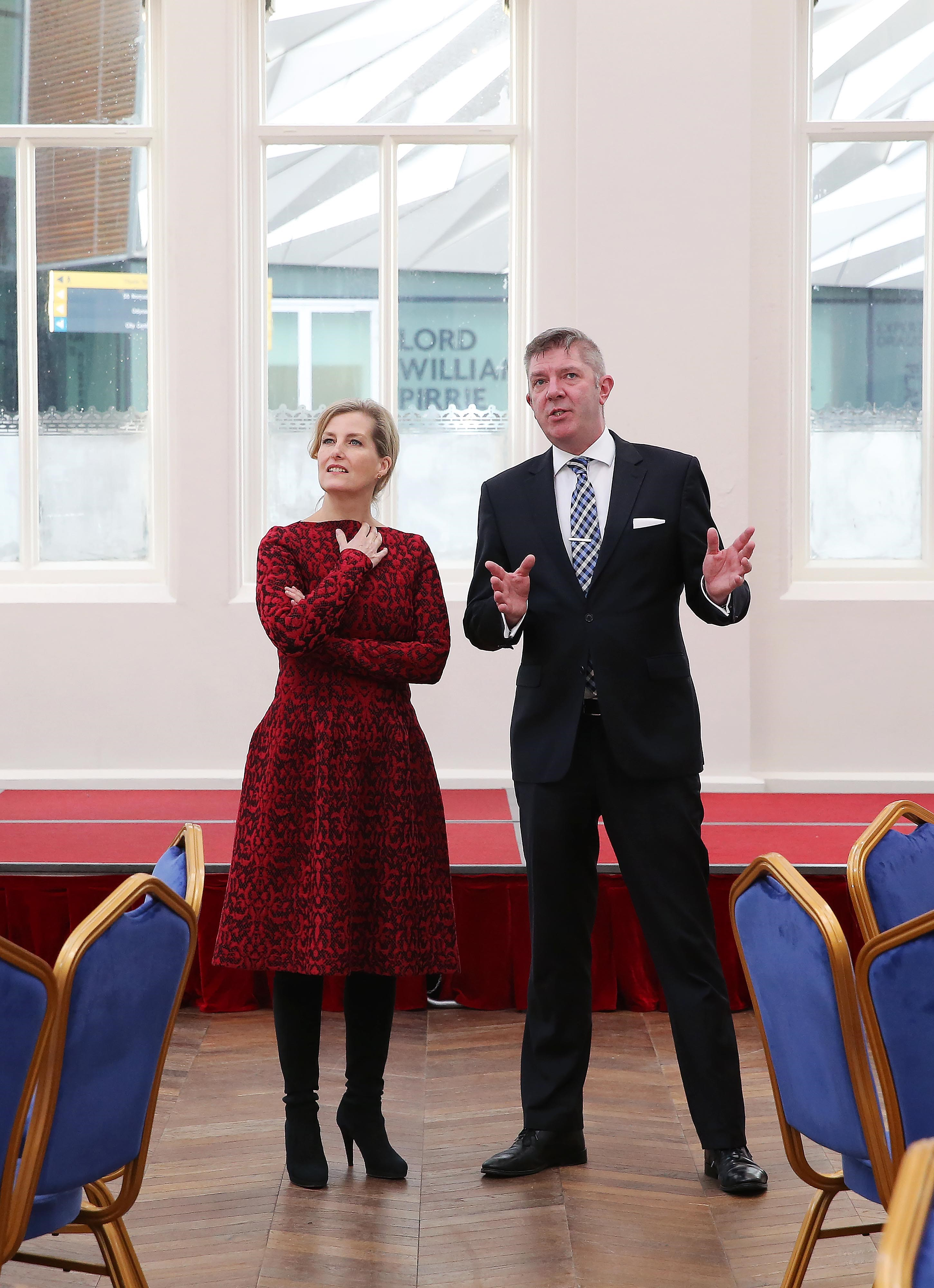
Sophie at the Titanic Hotel in Belfast in 2018

An avid supporter of charities that deal with learning disabilities, Sophie made a solo trip to Belfast in January 2018 to visit a number of charities that she had supported through her work over the last decade, including Mencap's children's centre. She also opened the new dementia-friendly unit of Northern Ireland Hospice, the first of its kind in the UK. Sophie and Edward visited Sri Lanka in February 2018 to celebrate the 70th Anniversary of Independence, Sri Lanka–United Kingdom relations, the Commonwealth, education and young people. In October 2018, Edward and Sophie toured the Baltic states.

In March 2019, Sophie travelled to New York City to attend the 63rd session of the United Nations Commission on the Status of Women (CSW). The annual event brought together more than 9,000 gender equality representatives from around the world. The CSW is "the principal global intergovernmental body exclusively dedicated to the promotion of gender equality and the empowerment of women." From 29 April to 3 May 2019, Sophie, Vice-Patron of the Queen Elizabeth Diamond Jubilee Trust, visited India in her final overseas tour as vice-patron ahead of the Trust's planned closure in January 2020. Sophie saw the work the charitable foundation has supported to tackle avoidable blindness and heard about programmes successfully launched by Queen's Young Leaders.

In July 2019, Sophie and Edward visited Forfar on their first official visit to the town since the Queen granted the Earl the additional title Earl of Forfar in March 2019. Later in October, she visited Kosovo to meet victims of sexual violence after the Kosovo War and their families. By the end of 2019, Sophie had completed 236 official engagements.

In March 2020, Sophie became the first member of the royal family to visit South Sudan. During the visit, which was requested by the Foreign and Commonwealth Office, Sophie met victims and survivors of gender-based violence and promoted their rights by meeting the female political leaders in the country.

In January 2022, she went on a solo visit to Qatar in her capacity as the global ambassador for the International Agency for the Prevention of Blindness (IAPB) to support the organisation's '2030 in Sight' initiative and visit projects by the Qatar Fund and Orbis International aimed at improving eye tests and treatments in India and Bangladesh. As a supporter of the Women Peace and Security Network she met with Afghan women refugees who had been evacuated from the country following the 2021 Taliban offensive. In March 2022, Sophie went on a four-day solo trip to New York City, visiting the Queen Elizabeth II September 11th Garden and Consuls General from across the Commonwealth to mark the Commonwealth Day. She also delivered the keynote address on women's rights in Afghanistan at an event hosted by the UN Women and the Georgetown Institute for Women, Peace and Security.

In April 2022, Edward and Sophie toured Saint Lucia, Saint Vincent and the Grenadines, and Antigua and Barbuda to mark the Queen's Platinum Jubilee. Their planned visit to Grenada was postponed after talks with the island's government and governor general, and the couple expressed their hopes to visit the country on a later date. In October 2022 and September 2025, she visited the Democratic Republic of the Congo to engage with projects preventing sexual and gender-based violence in conflict, becoming the first member of the royal family to visit the country. The 2022 tour also included visits to Rwanda, Botswana, and Malawi.

After her husband was created Duke of Edinburgh on his 59th birthday, Sophie and Edward visited Edinburgh to meet with members of the Ukrainian and Eastern European communities in the city, some of whom were displaced following the Russian invasion of Ukraine. In May 2023, Sophie visited Iraq at the request of the Foreign Office to promote the Women, Peace and Security agenda and raise awareness about conflict-related sexual violence. She became the first member of the royal family to visit Baghdad.

On 29 April 2024, the Duchess visited Ukraine, the first British royal to make the trip since the Russian invasion, where she met with President Volodymyr Zelenskyy. Sophie also met with survivors of war-related sexual violence and torture as well as children who had been returned to Ukraine after being abducted from their families by Russia. She also paid her respects to victims of the massacre in Bucha. In October 2024, she became the first member of the royal family to visit Chad where she met with refugees who had fled to the country following the Sudanese civil war and had experienced sexual violence during the conflict. In November 2025, at the request of the Foreign, Commonwealth and Development Office, Sophie completed an overseas tour to Central and South America, focusing on environmental protection, women's empowerment and military. In November 2026, she made her second visit to Bangladesh, with the aim of strengthening the relationship between the UK and Bangladesh and witnessing the assistance being provided to the Rohingya community.

Sophie undertakes hundreds of public engagements annually, with a focus on education, healthcare, and military outreach.

== Charity work and patronage ==
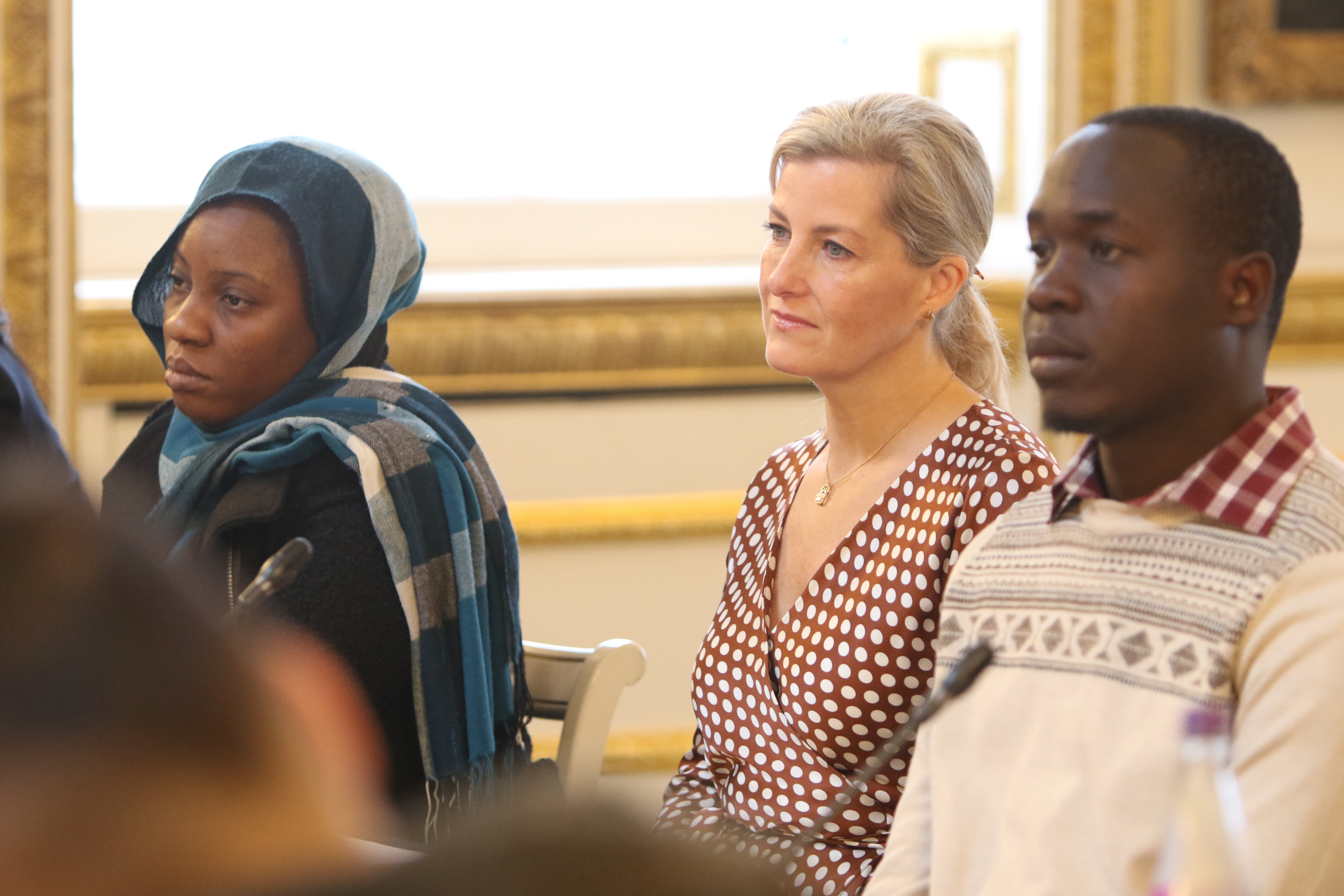
Sophie at the 2018 Preventing Sexual Violence in Conflict Film Festival. Much of her charity work involves women's rights.

Sophie and Edward established their foundation, the Bagshot Park Charity, later renamed the Wessex Youth Trust, in 1999 to support initiatives and charities that help children and young people. After twenty years of operation, the Wessex Youth Trust reverted back to an earlier name, the Earl and Countess of Wessex Charitable Trust, in 2019 and its management was transferred to the private office of the Earl and Countess of Wessex and Forfar. It was announced that the trust's broad charitable objectives would not change, however, their future efforts would be aimed towards supporting a different range of charities. In July 2023, the trust's remaining funds were transferred to the Edinburgh Trust No. 2, which was originally set up in 1964.

In 2000, Sophie became patron of a number of organisations, including Foundation of Light (formerly Sunderland A.F.C Foundation) which develops educational and community programmes in northern England, based around football. Moved by the death of her friend Jill Dando in 1999, Sophie became a trustee of UCL Jill Dando Institute, an institute of crime science established in her name in 2001. As a full-time member of the royal family, part of her focus became charities that dealt with communications difficulties, including Southampton General Hospital, and the New Haven Trust in Toronto, a learning centre for children with autism. In 2003, she became patron of Tomorrow's People Trust, which helps the disadvantaged to find work, housing and a place in society. In February 2003, Sophie became patron and ambassador of Meningitis Now, a charity that supports meningitis patients and raises awareness of the disease. Later that month, she became patron to The Scar Free Foundation, a medical research charity coordinating funds in wound healing, burns and cleft research. In 2003, she succeeded Queen Elizabeth the Queen Mother as patron of the Royal College of Speech and Language Therapists. Also in 2003, she became patron of the Moor House School & College, which specialises in helping children who have Developmental language disorder.

Sophie, who was a Brownie as a child, became the new president of Girlguiding UK in 2003, following the death of Princess Margaret in February 2002, and remained in that position until 2024 when she became the organisation's patron subsequent to the Queen's death in 2022. Sophie established the Women in Business Group in 2003 to support the Duke of Edinburgh's Award and reach more young people to help them develop skills that can transform their futures. Sophie became president of the Brainwave Centre in 2003, a charity providing therapy for children with developmental delay. In June 2003, she became patron of the Greater London Fund for the Blind, which raises funds for smaller charities for visually impaired people in London. In August 2003, Sophie received patronage of the National Autistic Society, passed down from Anne, Princess Royal. In 2004, she joined St John Ambulance as grand president, and heads the work of St John's County Presidents, who provide a variety of support for their local St John members. She was associated with ChildLine for many years, preceding her appointment as their first ever royal patron in 2005. In 2006, she lent her support to the Born in Bradford research project, which investigated causes of low birth weight and infant mortality between 2007 and 2010. In September 2006, she was appointed an Honorary Fellow of the Royal College of Obstetricians and Gynaecologists. In the same year, she became patron of England Hockey.

Sophie is a supporter of agriculture, farming and food production and held the position of show president of the Royal Bath and West Show in 2010 before becoming vice patron in 2011. She is also patron of the Association of Show and Agricultural Organisations and has been patron of the Border Union Agricultural Society since its bicentennial year in 2012. Sophie works to support the 'Campaign for Wool', which was set up by the then-Prince of Wales, and aims to promote the use of British wool. During her 2013 trips to India, and Qatar, Sophie visited numerous facilities in her capacity as patron of Vision 2020: The Right to Sight and ambassador for IAPB, in order to raise awareness about preventable blindness. Her work on the issue has been described as influential in creating the Qatar Creating Vision initiative. In 2013, Sophie became the first ever patron of the London College of Fashion and was announced as the royal patron of British Wheelchair Basketball. In June 2013, she was appointed global ambassador for the Duke of Edinburgh's International Award Foundation, an umbrella body co-ordinating organisations running the Duke of Edinburgh's Award worldwide. She has been the founder and chairman of the Duke of Edinburgh's Award Women's Network Forum since January 2014, whose goal is the advancement of gender balance and equality by influencing business leaders, inspiring the next generation and sharing best practice. In June 2014, Sophie was appointed the patron of Ubunye Foundation, based in the Eastern Cape, South Africa, a rural development trust dedicated to unlocking the potential of rural communities.

On Sophie's 50th birthday, she became vice patron of the Queen Elizabeth Diamond Jubilee Trust, a charitable foundation established in 2012 for Queen Elizabeth II's Diamond Jubilee. The trust was a time-limited foundation and closed on 31 January 2020. In February 2015, the Queen gave a joint reception to celebrate the 50th birthdays of Sophie and Edward, as well as their patronages and affiliations, at Buckingham Palace. Elizabeth, accompanied by the couple, met key supporters, staff, volunteers and alumni from the charities of their patronage and presidency, as well as representatives from their various military appointments. In November 2015, 100 Women in Hedge Funds announced that Sophie would serve as Global Ambassador of 100WF's Next Generation initiatives. In September 2016, Sophie took part in a cycling challenge from the Holyrood Palace to Buckingham Palace for the Duke of Edinburgh's Award Diamond Challenge. The ride raised more than £180,000 for the Award, which was celebrating its 60th anniversary. Linking Environment and Farming (LEAF) named Sophie as its new honorary president in October 2016. In November 2016, she was announced as Women of the Future's official ambassador, which supports and celebrates the successes of young women. In December 2016, Sophie participated in ICAP charity day in order to raise money for Shooting Star Chase, a children's hospice of which she is patron. During the same month, after the Queen stepped down from her position as patron of numerous charities, Sophie replaced her as the principal patron of NSPCC, Blind Veterans UK and British Cycling Federation.

Sophie was elected president of the Devon County Agricultural Association in February 2017. In May 2017, as patron of the British Bobsleigh and Skeleton Association Sophie attended its 90th anniversary and commemorative athlete awards dinner. The Ice Maiden, five British Army women, received royal patronage from her for their ambitious coast-to-coast ski expedition across Antarctica in October 2017. The team aimed to inspire women and girls everywhere to challenge perceptions and grow their ambitions. In January 2018, Sophie became the Royal Patron of the Nursing Memorial Appeal. The Appeal aims to create a memorial dedicated to the 1,500 nurses who gave their lives in First and Second World Wars. In February 2018, Westmorland Agricultural Society welcomed Sophie as its president. In January 2019, Sophie became the patron of the Thames Valley Air Ambulance, which saved her life during her ectopic pregnancy in 2001. On 29 January, she was elected president of the Royal Smithfield Club, which promotes the education and knowledge to advance best practice in the meat and livestock industry. On International Women's Day March 2019, Sophie officially announced her involvement in taking a stand against sex crimes in conflict zones, joining Angelina Jolie to work with the Preventing Sexual Violence in Conflict Initiative (PSVI) as well as Women, Peace and Security (WPS) formed 20 years ago to tackle the impact of armed conflict on women and girls, and to promote the positive role women play in building peace and stability. On 25 April 2019, it was announced that Sophie, along with her husband and her brother-in-law, the Duke of York, had each been appointed vice president of the annual Royal Windsor Horse Show. In May 2019, she took over the patronage of the Chartered Management Institute from Prince Philip, Duke of Edinburgh.

In April 2020, Sophie helped Rhubarb, a catering company, in preparing and delivering food to NHS staff amidst the coronavirus pandemic, an initiative organised by Ian Wace. Sophie has also volunteered at local food banks, including the Hope Hub and the Lighthouse, in Surrey and delivered parcels to the homeless during the pandemic. In September 2020, Sophie, alongside her husband and children, participated in the Great British Beach Clean at Southsea Beach in support of the Marine Conservation Society.

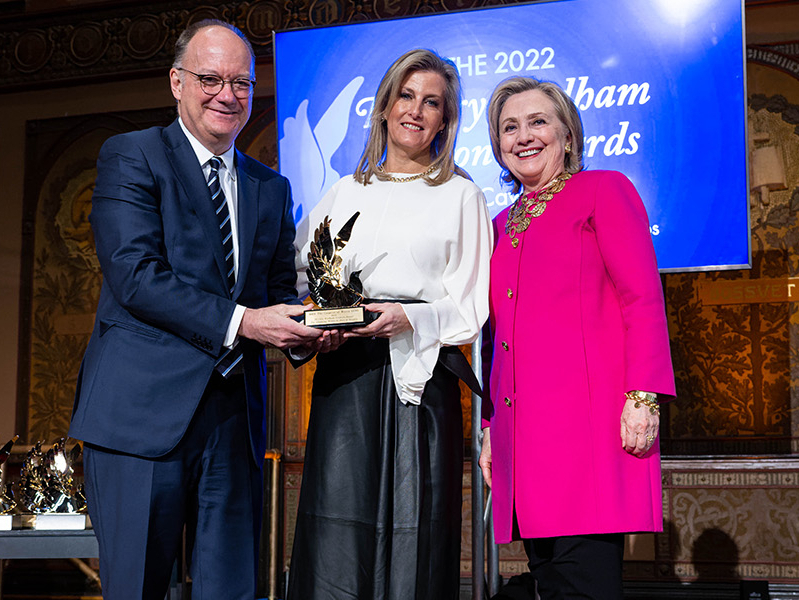
Sophie receiving the 2022 Hillary Rodham Clinton Award at Georgetown University in Washington, D.C.

In February 2021, as grand president of St John Ambulance, Sophie started working as a care volunteer at an NHS vaccination centre. In May 2021, she become royal patron of Wellbeing of Women, a charity focused on all areas of women's reproductive health across a woman's life course, from menstrual health to menopause. A patron of this charity, she later discussed her own struggles with menopause and how it affected her memory. In July 2021, Princess Alexandra handed over the patronage of The Guide Dogs for the Blind Association to Sophie. In December 2022, Sophie was honoured at the Georgetown Institute for Women, Peace and Security, where she received the Hillary Rodham Clinton Award for her work concerning sexual violence in war zones.

Sophie made a surprise appearance on CBeebies Bedtime Stories in October 2024, reading Specs for Rex by Yasmeen Ismail to mark World Sight Day. In February 2025, she became patron of the Mothers' Union, following in the footsteps of Queen Victoria, Queen Elizabeth the Queen Mother, and Queen Elizabeth II. In 2026, she designed the "Plants with Purpose Garden" alongside garden designer Alan Williams for the Royal Windsor Flower Show to highlight the importance of healthy soil, food production, and environmental responsibility. The plants and flowers were eventually donated for planting to two primary schools as part of the Royal Windsor Rose and Horticultural Society's "The Nature Studies" programme. In the same year, she appeared in the BBC Radio drama The Archers, playing herself, to raise the profile of her charity Linking Environment and Farming (LEAF). In August 2026, it was announced that Sophie would become patron of Visualise Scotland, a charity supporting adults with visual impairment and complex disabilities in Edinburgh and the Lothians.

== Public image and style ==
At the start of her relationship with Prince Edward, Sophie was referred to as "the girl next door", and noted for her successful career and ordinary background. In the early years of her marriage, Sophie faced public scrutiny for her business interests, and was often compared to the late Diana, Princess of Wales, who had died two years earlier. On her transition to becoming a full-time royal, she later stated: "Certainly it took me a while to find my feet. The frustration was I had to reduce my expectations of what I could actually do. I couldn't turn up at a charity and go, right, I think you should be doing this, because that's what I was used to doing in my working life. I had to take a really big step back and go, OK, they want you to be the icing on the cake, the person to come in to thank their volunteers and funders, not necessarily to tell them how to run their communications plan."

Sophie has since been cited as an under-the-radar "stabilizing influence" and a "safe pair of hands". She has been said to have a low-key approach to royal engagements, and often drives herself to and from events. Amanda Pullinger stated to Town and Country, "She actually presents herself as an ordinary person and I think that is increasingly what the royal family needs to do." She has also been noted for her long-term work on "gritty" subject matters such as gender-based violence in conflict, and trips to "difficult areas", including Kosovo, Sierra Leone, South Sudan, the Democratic Republic of the Congo and Colombia. Sophie's engagements gained significant attention from the public post-Megxit, with her charity work and style choices receiving increased commentary and analysis. Writer Ingrid Seward states that Sophie "is not a self-publicist....She looks good, without being over-the-top, and she's not craving celebrity. You often wouldn't know she had carried out all those engagements."

Sophie was not initially prominent for her fashion, but eventually began to develop her own style and has worn outfits by many notable designers. She has exclusively worn Jane Taylor millinery designs since 2009 on numerous occasions. In a Marie Claire interview, Taylor described her first royal commission: "My first royal client was the Countess of Wessex, and it was quite nerve-racking. But she wears such lovely clothes and she always looks so fabulous, so it's quite easy to design for her. Since she came to see me, she's never worn any other milliner's hats, which is a big compliment. I was really excited, honored, and slightly nervous." Alongside the Princess of Wales and the Duchess of Sussex, Sophie has been named one of the most stylish members of the royal family. Sophie is particularly known for wearing different combinations of hats and coats, and favours silk dresses and frocks. Describing her style in an interview by Sunday Express Sophie said: "It's about my charities, but I recognize that I'm on display. [...] When you walk into a room, yes, people are going to talk about what you're doing there, but they're also going to want to know what you're wearing". She also revealed that she has never had a stylist of her own and that she makes her fashion choices herself. In 2015, Sophie was named on Vanity Fair's Best Dressed List. Together with the then-Duchess of Cambridge, Sophie hosted the Commonwealth Fashion Exchange reception at Buckingham Palace during the 2018 London Fashion Week.

== Privacy and the media ==
=== Violation of privacy ===
In May 1999, less than a month before her wedding, The Sun published a photo of a topless Sophie with her Capital Radio colleague Chris Tarrant, which had been taken during a business trip to Spain in 1988. Buckingham Palace immediately issued a statement saying, "This morning's story in The Sun is a gross invasion of privacy and cannot be regarded as in the public interest. It has caused considerable distress." Prime Minister Tony Blair also condemned the publication of the photograph. The Palace made an official complaint to the Press Complaints Commission (PCC). According to Sophie's business partner the incident had left her "distressed", and she was reportedly "devastated" and felt "she was 'letting the side down' before her wedding". Tarrant later said, "There was never, ever the slightest hint of romance between Sophie and myself, let alone these snidey insinuations." Following its publication, the newspaper issued a statement and apologised to Rhys-Jones and the next issue came out with the headline "Sorry, Sophie". It also said that it would again apologise to Sophie in a letter and donate all sale proceeds of the issue to her charities. The photo was sold to the tabloid by Kara Noble, a former friend and colleague of Sophie. Noble later apologised in the following months saying, "I just want to say sorry to everyone who was involved." Both she and the newspaper faced criticism from the public, and Noble was fired from her job at Heart 106.2 FM. The couple later decided not to make a formal complaint.

In 2011, close associates of Jonathan Rees, a private investigator connected to the News International phone hacking scandal, stated that he had penetrated Sophie and Edward's bank accounts and sold details about them to the Sunday Mirror.

=== Media sting ===
In April 2001, Sophie appeared in the media after she was misled in a meeting at the Dorchester by a News of the World reporter posing as an Arab sheikh, Mazher Mahmood, who was later deemed to have lied in a pre-trial hearing in Southwark Crown Court at which he was a witness. It was claimed by the newspapers that during their "secretly taped" conversation, Sophie had insulted the royal family and politicians, calling the Queen "old dear" and criticising the leadership of prime ministers John Major and Tony Blair and Chancellor of the Exchequer Gordon Brown. She also reportedly commented on Prince Charles's relationship with his then-partner Camilla, arguing that a marriage would not be possible as long as the Queen Mother was alive. However, despite some initial reports, the paper acquitted her of referring to Cherie Blair as "absolutely horrid" and mocking Leader of the Opposition William Hague's appearance. Murray Harkin, Sophie's business partner who was also present at the meeting, was recorded discussing his sex life and cocaine use and boasting about Sophie's abilities in securing celebrities for various events. Tabloid newspapers claimed she had sent apology letters to Blair, Hague and Prince Charles.

Buckingham Palace denied the accuracy of the reports, saying: "The Countess of Wessex, who is trying to pursue her own career, is obviously vulnerable to set-ups such as this." The Palace released a statement saying the reported comments were "selective, distorted and in several cases, flatly untrue". The Palace officials stated that Sophie had not insulted the Queen, the Queen Mother, or the politicians, while according to the Mail on Sunday four reliable sources had confirmed these reports. The News of the World attributed the negative reactions to the jealousy of the rival media, as the outlet had previously conducted an interview with Sophie in which she addressed the rumours about her difficulties in marriage and discussed her husband's sexuality. Sophie had reportedly agreed to the intimate interview on the condition that the newspaper would not publish transcript of the tapes. In a separate statement Sophie said she was "distressed by the carrying out of an entrapment operation" on her, but also regretted her "own misjudgment in succumbing to that subterfuge". Subsequently, in 2002, both Sophie and Edward announced that they would quit their business interests in order to focus on activities and official engagements on behalf of the royal family and aid the Queen in her Golden Jubilee year.

=== Jewellery gifts ===
Sophie was criticised for accepting two sets of jewels from the royal family of Bahrain during an official day-long visit to the country in December 2011, as she and her husband returned to the UK from a trip to Afghanistan. She was given one set by King Hamad bin Isa Al Khalifa and a second set by the country's prime minister, Sheikh Khalifa bin Salman Al Khalifa. Her husband, the Earl, received a pen and a watch as well as a silk rug from the Crown Prince of Bahrain, Sheikh Salman bin Hamad Al Khalifa, who also gave Sophie a silver and pearl cup. The value of the jewellery has not been estimated and its precise contents were not disclosed. Given concern about human rights abuses in Bahrain, this gift attracted controversy, with calls for the jewels to be sold, and the proceeds used for the benefit of the Bahraini people.

Critics said Sophie should sell the gems and give the proceeds to political protesters in Bahrain. Denis MacShane, then a Labour Member of Parliament (MP) and previously a Foreign Office minister, said: "Given the appalling suffering and repression of the Bahraini people, it would be a fitting gesture for the Countess of Wessex to auction these trinkets and distribute the proceeds to the victims of the regime."

Royal family guidelines and procedures relating to gifts, published by the government in 2003, state that "before accepting any gift, careful consideration should always be given, wherever practicable, to the donor, the reason for and occasion of the gift and the nature of the gift itself ... Equally, before declining the offer of a gift, careful consideration should be given to any offence that might be caused by such action."

== Titles, styles, honours and arms ==
=== Titles and styles ===
Sophie was styled as "Her Royal Highness The Countess of Wessex" from her marriage in 1999 to 2023. On 10 March 2019, her husband was created Earl of Forfar, according her the title by courtesy of Countess of Forfar. She was at times referred to as the Countess of Wessex and Forfar, such as at the funerals of her father-in-law and mother-in-law. Since 10 March 2023, when her husband was created Duke of Edinburgh (for life), she has been known as "Her Royal Highness The Duchess of Edinburgh".

=== Honours ===
- 2002: Recipient of the Queen Elizabeth II Golden Jubilee Medal
- 2004: Recipient of the Royal Family Order of Elizabeth II
- 2005: Recipient of the Commemorative Medal for the Centennial of Saskatchewan
- 2010: Dame Grand Cross of the Royal Victorian Order (GCVO)
- 2012: Recipient of the Queen Elizabeth II Diamond Jubilee Medal
- 2017: Recipient of the Service Medal of the Order of St John
- 2021: Recipient of the Service Medal of the Order of St John (with bar)
- 2022: Recipient of the Queen Elizabeth II Platinum Jubilee Medal
- 2022: Dame Grand Cross of the Most Venerable Order of Saint John (GCStJ)
  - 2005–2022: Dame of Justice of the Most Venerable Order of Saint John (DStJ)
- 2023: Recipient of the King Charles III Coronation Medal
- 2023: Recipient of the Canadian Forces' Decoration (CD)
- 2024: Recipient of the Royal Family Order of Charles III

==== Foreign ====
- (Mexico) 9 September 2015: Sash of the Mexican Order of the Aztec Eagle
- 5 October 2017: Recipient of the Sultan of Brunei Golden Jubilee Medal
- (Sweden) 19 June 2010: Recipient of the Wedding of Crown Princess Victoria and Prince Daniel Medal
- (Portugal) 3 June 2026: Key to the City of Porto

==== Honorary military appointments ====
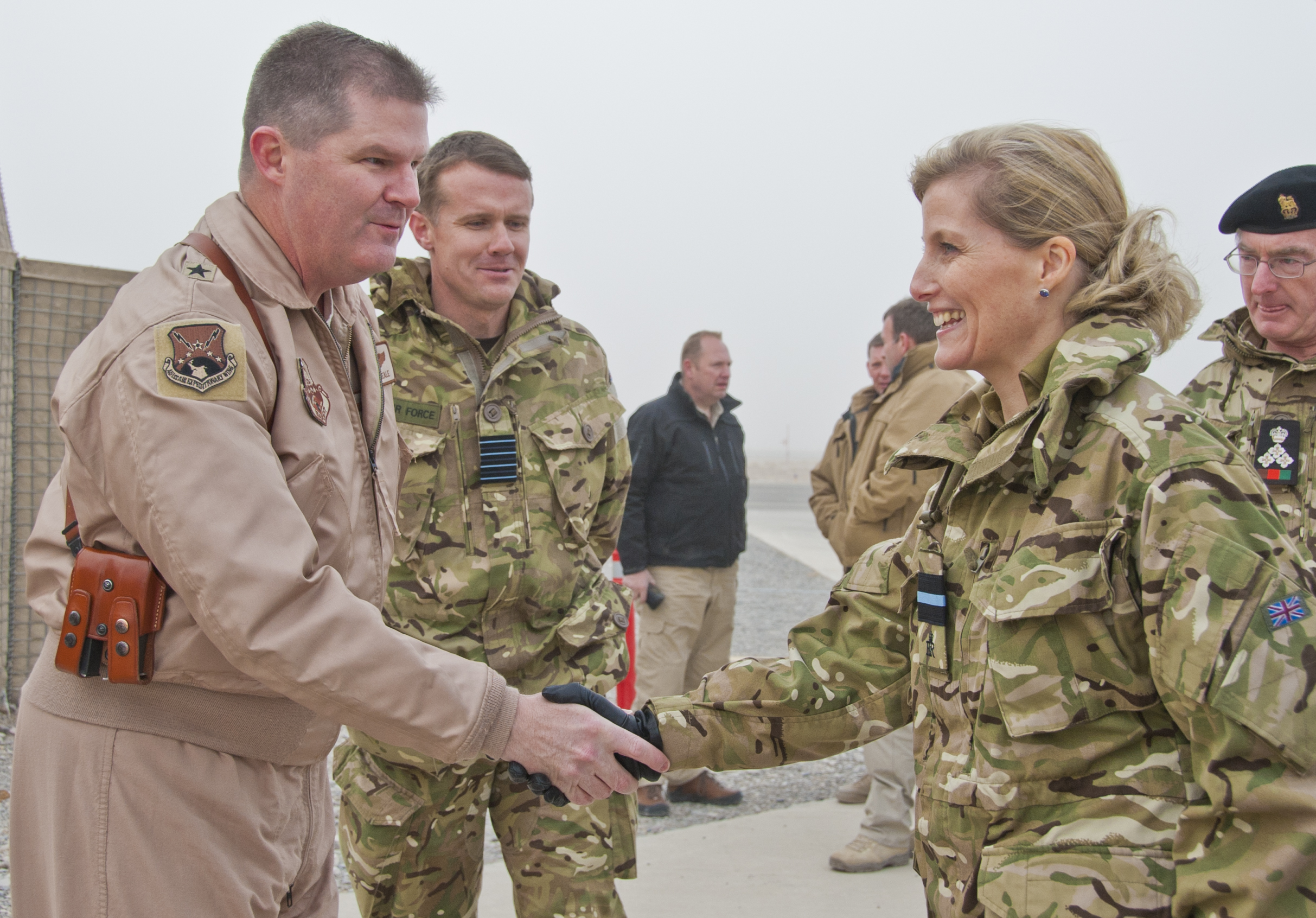
In Honorary Air Commodore combat dress on a visit to Kandahar in 2011

Canada

- (Canada) 2004: Colonel-in-Chief of the Lincoln and Welland Regiment;
- (Canada) 2005: Colonel-in-Chief of the South Alberta Light Horse

United Kingdom

- (United Kingdom) 2003–2024: Colonel-in-Chief of the Queen Alexandra's Royal Army Nursing Corps
- (United Kingdom) 2005: Colonel-in-Chief of the Royal Corps of Army Music
- (United Kingdom) 2006: Lady Sponsor of HMS Daring
- (United Kingdom) 2007: Royal Colonel of the 5th Battalion The Rifles
- (United Kingdom) 2008: Honorary Air Commodore Royal Air Force Wittering
- (United Kingdom) 2022: Colonel-in-Chief of the Corps of Royal Electrical and Mechanical Engineers
- (United Kingdom) 2023: Colonel-in-Chief of the Royal Irish Regiment
- (United Kingdom) 2023: Royal Colonel of the Queen's Own Yeomanry
- (United Kingdom) 2024: Deputy Colonel-in-Chief of the Royal Army Medical Service

==== Fellowships ====
- 2025: The College of Optometrists, Honorary Fellow
- 2026: Royal Windsor Rose & Horticultural Society, Fellow

==== Honorific eponyms ====
- The Duchess of Edinburgh's String Orchestra (formerly the Countess of Wessex's String Orchestra)
- The Duchess of Edinburgh Cup (formerly the Countess of Wessex Cup), an annual competition which sees regiments and military organisations affiliated with Sophie compete against each other in a series of challenges
- The rose cultivar Rosa 'Countess of Wessex' was named in her honour in 2004.

=== Arms ===
Coat of arms of the Duchess of Edinburgh
Notes The Duchess bears the arms of her husband impaled with her father's. Prior to marrying Prince Edward her father Christopher Rhys-Jones had arms redesigned by Sir Peter Gwynn-Jones, Garter King of Arms, based on a 200-year-old family blazon never previously recognised. The new grant of arms included a remainder to Christopher's elder brother Theo Rhys-Jones and issue. About her new family coat of arms, Sophie is quoted saying: "It's wonderful, I'm absolutely thrilled", "It's not modern and different, because it is representative of my family's heritage, so it's in keeping with that." Adopted 1999 Coronet Coronet of a child of the Sovereign. Escutcheon Quarterly, 1st and 4th Gules three Lions passant guardant in pale Or armed and langed Azure, 2nd Or a Lion rampant Gules armed and langued Azure within a Double Tressure flory counterflory of the Second, 3rd Azure a Harp Or stringed Argent, the whole differenced with a Label of three Points Argent with the central Point charged with a Tudor Rose (Royal Arms differenced for Prince Edward); impaled with a Shield quarterly Gules and Azure a Lion rampant regardant within an Orle Or (for Rhys-Jones); and, in chief, as an augmentation of honour, the arms of the Order of St John (for GCStJ). Supporters Dexter, a Lion rampant gardant Or crowned with the Coronet of the rank of a child of the Sovereign Proper; Sinister, a Wyvern Azure gorged with a Coronet Or composed of Crosses pattées and Fleurs-de-lis a Chain affixed also Or. Motto CAS GŴR NI CHÂR Y WLAD A'I MACO (Welsh: Hateful the man who loves not the country that nurtured him) Orders Surrounding the Shield, the Royal Victorian Order circlet inscribed with its motto: VICTORIA; augmented in chief by the arms of the Order of St John as a Dame Grand Cross (GCStJ). Other elements GCVO insignia suspended below the Shield (optional). Symbolism The Duchess's family arms allude to her family's Welsh heritage and one of her noble ancestors the warrior Elystan Glodrydd, Prince of Ferrig (represented by the lion). Red and blue are the regimental colours of the Royal Fusiliers, in which members of her family have served. The wyvern is a symbol of Wessex, appropriate to the earldom of Wessex (now a subsidiary title). Previous versions Previous versions of her marital arms were depicted superimposed upon the Badge of the Order of St John (when DJStJ) replaced in 2010 by the Royal Victorian Order circlet (as GCVO). Her arms since 2022 represent both her being a Dame Grand Cross of the Royal Victorian Order (by its circlet) and of the Order of St John (with its augmentation of honour in chief). Prior to her marriage, Sophie Rhys-Jones bore her father's arms on a lozenge.

== Authored articles ==
- HRH The Countess of Wessex (10 October 2013). "World Sight Day: Blindness is a matter of life and death". The Telegraph. London. Archived from the original on 12 January 2022.
- HRH The Countess of Wessex (7 March 2019). "Why I'm joining the fight to end the silence around women in conflict". The Telegraph. London. Archived from the original on 12 January 2022.
- HRH The Countess of Wessex (31 October 2020). "Women are the unsung heroes of peacebuilding". The Telegraph. London. Archived from the original on 12 January 2022.
- The Duchess of Edinburgh (9 January 2026). "The world is ignoring the Sudan war". The Telegraph. London. Archived from the original on 10 January 2026.
- The Duchess of Edinburgh (14 July 2026). "Country shows are the greatest shows on earth". The Yorkshire Post. Archived from the original on 15 July 2026.

Orders of precedence in the United Kingdom
Preceded by Princess Lilibet of Sussex	Ladies; HRH The Duchess of Edinburgh	Succeeded by The Princess Royal
