= William Lindsay (actor) =

British actor (1945–1986)

- Born: William Denis Mary Lindsay; 15 August 1945; Dublin, Ireland
- Died: 14 May 1986 (aged 40); London, England
- Occupation: Actor

William Lindsay (15 August 1945 – 14 May 1986) was a British actor.

His television credits include Colditz, Enemy at the Door, Doctor Who (in the serial State of Decay), Angels and Blake's 7.

== Filmography ==
| Year | Title | Role | Notes |
|---|---|---|---|
| 1980 | Doctor Who | Zargo | in the serial State of Decay |
| 1980 | Angels | Dr. Peter Drew | 9 episodes |
| 1985 | Lifeforce | Colonel's Aide | (final film role) |
