= Wedding of Prince Edward and Sophie Rhys-Jones =

1999 British royal wedding

- Combined coat of arms of the Earl and Countess of Wessex
- Date: 19 June 1999; 27 years ago
- Location: St. George's Chapel, Windsor Castle, Berkshire, England
- Participants: Prince Edward; Sophie Rhys-Jones

The wedding of Prince Edward and Sophie Rhys-Jones took place on 19 June 1999 in St George's Chapel at Windsor Castle. Edward was created Earl of Wessex hours before the ceremony.

== Background and engagement ==
Prince Edward, youngest child of Queen Elizabeth II, met Sophie Rhys-Jones for the first time in 1987 when he was dating her friend. The pair met again at a tennis event in 1993 and began dating shortly afterwards. He announced his engagement to Sophie on 6 January 1999. Edward proposed to Sophie with a delicate engagement ring featuring a two-carat oval diamond flanked by two heart-shaped gemstones set in 18-carat white gold. This engagement ring was made by Asprey and Garrard (now Garrard & Co) and it is worth an estimated £105,000.

== Wedding ceremony ==
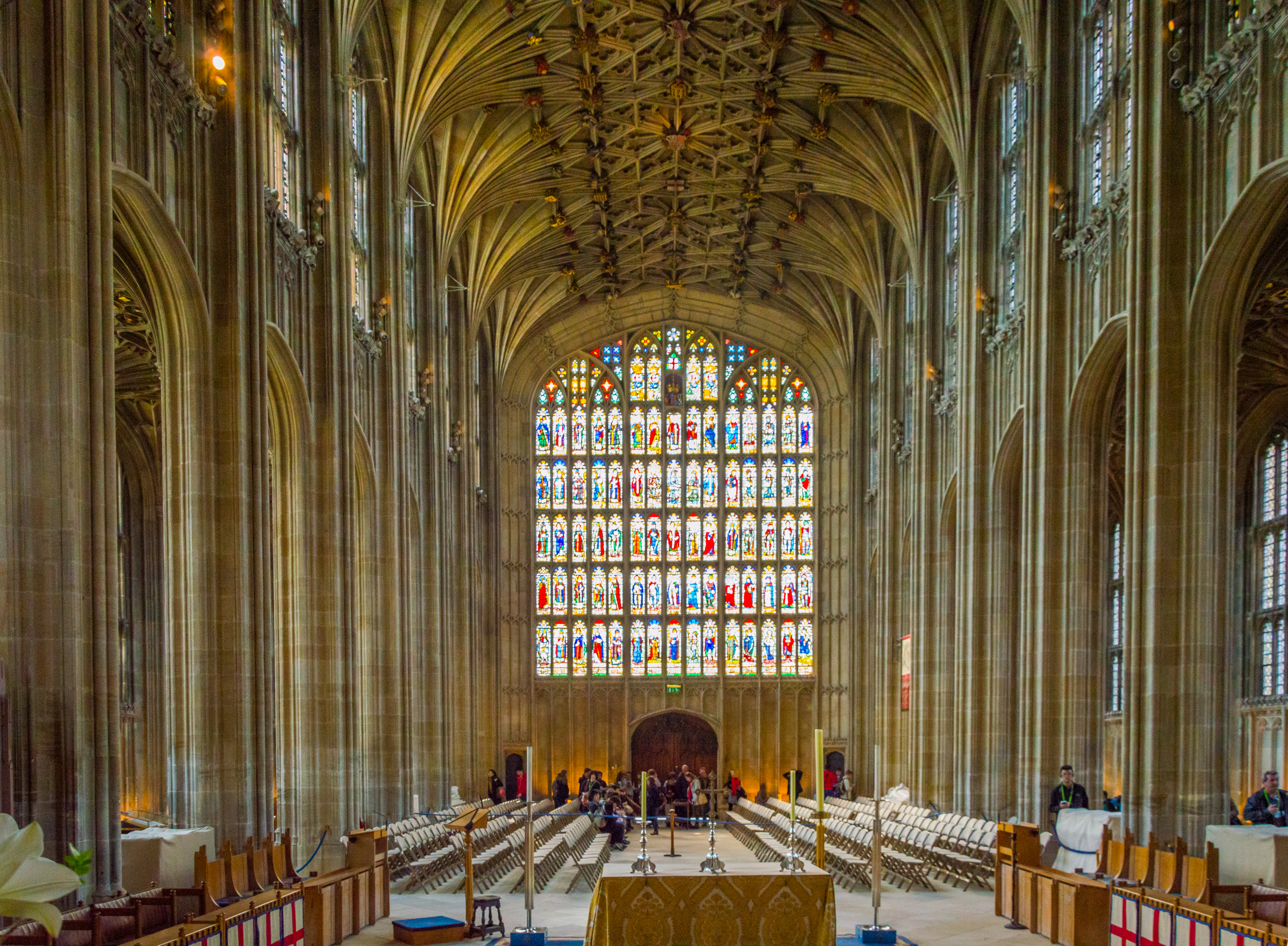
St George's Chapel, Windsor Castle

External videos
- The Royal Wedding of Prince Edward and Sophie Rhys-Jones 1999 (external video)

The wedding took place at St George's Chapel, Windsor Castle. At the time of their engagement, Edward and Sophie made known their wish that the wedding not be turned into a state occasion, causing there to be no ceremonial state or military involvement. The ceremony was mainly a family occasion. Prime Minister Tony Blair and other politicians were not invited.

Rather than court dress, the couple requested that guests attend wearing formal evening gowns, and not to wear hats to reflect their wish for a more informal royal wedding. Queen Elizabeth the Queen Mother wore a hat regardless, as she was rarely seen in public without one. It was the town of Windsor's largest occasion since the 1952 funeral of King George VI.

Edward's two brothers, Charles, Prince of Wales and Prince Andrew, Duke of York, both served as his supporters (the royal equivalent of the "best man"). Children of the couple's friends served as bridesmaids and page boys: Camilla Hadden, Olivia Taylor, Felix Sowerbutts, and Harry Warburton. The three royal brothers chose to leave their limousines behind and walk past the onlookers into the church, twenty minutes before the start of the ceremony.

Sophie arrived with her father Christopher Rhys-Jones in a Rolls-Royce owned by the Queen, and he walked her down the aisle while a fanfare by the Royal Marines was being played. Peter Nott, the Bishop of Norwich, performed the ceremony. Unlike previous royal weddings, like that of the Prince and Princess of Wales, Sophie chose to say the word "obey" in her vow "to love, cherish and obey", much as the former wife of her second eldest brother-in-law, Sarah, Duchess of York, had. The couple said their respective vows properly, though some onlookers noted Edward had a little difficulty placing the wedding ring on Sophie's finger. In keeping with tradition, the wedding ring was crafted from Welsh gold from the Prince Edward mine in Gwynedd. The tradition of using Welsh gold within the wedding rings of the royal family dates back to 1923.

Sophie wore a wedding dress designed by Samantha Shaw. It had a long, fitted coat with long sleeves, along with an ivory train that according to one source was "made from hand-dyed silk organza and hand-dyed silk crepe, with rows of pearls and crystal beading". Notably, the four girls and boys who carried her train were all commoners, the first time this has occurred in a royal wedding. Sophie wore a diamond tiara from the Queen's private collection, as well as a pearl cross necklace with matching pearl earrings by Asprey and Garrard that were designed and given to her by Edward for the wedding; Sophie in turn gave him an 18-carat gold pocket watch. Prince Edward's waistcoat was designed by John Kent. He also wore a cat-themed tie, and he has continued to wear cat-themed ties at other royal weddings and occasions since.

After the ceremony, Edward and Sophie rode in an open, horse-drawn carriage to the reception in St George's Hall at Windsor Castle, passing thousands of people en route. The Countess sent her wedding bouquet to Westminster Abbey to rest on the Grave of the Unknown Warrior. The tradition of Royal brides sending their bouquet to the Grave was started by Elizabeth Bowes-Lyon (later the Queen Mother) in 1923.

After the marriage ceremony, the guests were gathered at the Waterloo Chamber and the Grand Reception Room, where they were served canapés. A buffet-style dinner was later served at the George's Hall. The couple's 10-foot-tall chocolate cake was made by Linda Fripp and adorned with daffodil and tennis rackets. The National Youth Orchestra of Scotland, the London Mozart Players and the band of the Royal Marines were in charge of providing the music for the reception ceremony. Geoffrey Shakerley photographed the wedding of Edward and Sophie. Shakerley later admitted that Prince William's face was digitally enhanced by taking a happier smile from another photograph and placing it on some of the released shots to the press.

The couple spent their honeymoon at Balmoral Castle.

== Title upon marriage ==
Royal monogram

Hours before the ceremony, Prince Edward was created Earl of Wessex and Viscount Severn. Upon their marriage, the couple became known as Their Royal Highnesses The Earl and Countess of Wessex. Some constitutional scholars questioned why Edward had not been created a duke, as his brothers had before their weddings; it was made known at that time that Edward would be created Duke of Edinburgh after the death of his father, the then-Duke. (Prince Edward was eventually created Duke of Edinburgh for life on 10 March 2023.) The publishing director of Burke's Peerage, Harold Brooks-Baker, noted that Edward was the first son of a monarch since George I to not be made a duke. Historian David Starkey criticised the choice of title Earl of Wessex, remarking "The title itself is a total fiction. There is nowhere called Wessex... the title has not been used for a thousand years - is it the right way to celebrate the third millennium by going back to the first?"

== Broadcast ==
The wedding's broadcast garnered an estimated 200 million viewers from around the world.

== Reactions ==
Many media outlets noted the more "relaxed tone" of the wedding compared to previous royal ceremonies, such as the wedding of Prince Charles and Lady Diana Spencer, which took place at the larger St Paul's Cathedral. One called it the "people's wedding", and 8,000 people were picked at random and invited into the castle grounds. The wedding ceremony was positively received by the public, and parties were held at different places in the streets to celebrate the occasion. The marriage also had a positive reflection in the media, who labelled it as a love match which could be successful unlike the marriages of Edward's elder siblings. Andrew Motion wrote a poem in honour of the couple to mark the occasion. The couple's wedding-gift registry, which included items such as a $99,270 tea set, was made public and criticised by some media outlets.

== Guest list ==
The wedding was attended by 550 to 560 guests.

=== Relatives of the groom ===
- The Queen and the Duke of Edinburgh, the groom's parents
  - The Prince of Wales, the groom's brother
    - Prince William of Wales, the groom's nephew
    - Prince Harry of Wales, the groom's nephew
  - The Princess Royal and Commander Timothy Laurence, the groom's sister and brother-in-law
    - Peter Phillips, the groom's nephew
    - Zara Phillips, the groom's niece
  - The Duke of York, the groom's brother
    - Princess Beatrice of York, the groom's niece
    - Princess Eugenie of York, the groom's niece
- Queen Elizabeth the Queen Mother, the groom's maternal grandmother
  - The Princess Margaret, Countess of Snowdon and the Earl of Snowdon, the groom's maternal aunt and her ex-husband
    - Lady Sarah and Daniel Chatto, the groom's first cousin and her husband
- Prince George William of Hanover, the groom's paternal uncle by marriage
- The Duke and Duchess of Gloucester, the groom's first cousin, once removed, and his wife
  - Lady Davina Windsor, the groom's second cousin
  - Lady Rose Windsor, the groom's second cousin
- The Duke and Duchess of Kent, the groom's first cousin, once removed, and his wife
  - Earl and Countess of St Andrews, the groom's second cousin and his wife
  - Lady Helen and Timothy Taylor, the groom's second cousin and her husband
  - Lord Nicholas Windsor, the groom's second cousin
- Princess Alexandra, The Hon. Lady Ogilvy and The Rt Hon. Sir Angus Ogilvy, the groom's first cousin, once removed, and her husband
  - James and Julia Ogilvy, the groom's second cousin and his wife
  - Marina Ogilvy, the groom's second cousin
- Prince and Princess Michael of Kent, the groom's first cousin, once removed, and his wife
  - Lord Frederick Windsor, the groom's second cousin
  - Lady Gabriella Windsor, the groom's second cousin

=== Relatives of the bride ===
- Christopher and Mary Rhys-Jones, the bride's parents
  - David and Zara Rhys-Jones, the bride's brother and sister-in-law
- Theophilus Rhys-Jones, the bride's paternal uncle
- Thane Bettany, the bride's paternal step-uncle
- The Viscount Molesworth, the bride descends from Robert Molesworth, 1st Viscount Molesworth.

=== Other royal guests ===
- The Sultan, Raja Isteri, and Pengiran Isteri Mariam of Brunei
- Prince Joachim and Princess Alexandra of Denmark, the groom's third cousin once removed and his wife (representing the Queen of Denmark)
- Queen Anne-Marie of the Hellenes, the groom's third cousin (also wife of the groom's second cousin)
  - Prince Nikolaos of Greece and Denmark, the groom's second cousin once removed
- The Countess and Count of Schönburg-Glauchau, the groom's first cousin once removed and her husband
- Princess Cécile of Hohenlohe-Langenburg and Cyril de Commarque, the groom's first cousin once removed and her husband
- The Hereditary Prince of Hohenlohe-Langenburg, the groom's first cousin once removed
- Princess Xenia of Hohenlohe-Langenburg, the groom's first cousin once removed
- Prince Hassan bin Talal and Princess Sarvath al-Hassan of Jordan (representing the King of Jordan)
  - Princess Rahma bint Hassan of Jordan and Alaa Batayneh
- Prince Guillaume and Princess Sibilla of Luxembourg, the groom's third cousin once removed and the groom's fourth cousin (representing the Grand Duke of Luxembourg)
- The Crown Prince of Norway, the groom's third cousin (representing the King of Norway)
- The Prince of Asturias, the groom's second cousin once removed (representing the King of Spain)

=== Other notable guests ===
- Anthony Andrews
- Michael Ball
- Robin Bextor
- John Cleese
- Robbie Coltrane
- Harry Connick Jr.
- Billy Connolly
- Charles Dance
- Michael Elphick
- Sir David Frost
- Stephen Fry
- Duncan Goodhew
- Ruthie Henshall
- Tom Jones
- Tiggy Legge-Bourke
- The Lord and Lady Lloyd-Webber
- Nigel Mansell
- Barry McGuigan
- Robert Powell
- John Travolta
