= Huw van Steenis =

British financier (born 1969)

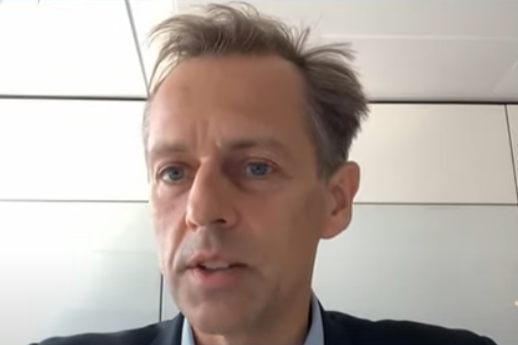
- Van Steenis in 2021
- Born: 27 September 1969 (age 56)
- Education: Trinity College, Oxford; INSEAD
- Occupation: Financier

Huw van Steenis (born 27 September 1969) is a British financier, former securities analyst and partner at Apollo Global Management.

He was formerly senior Adviser to Mark Carney, the former Governor of Bank of England where he led a review on the future of finance. Before that, he held the role of Global Coordinator, Banks and Diversified Financials within the Equity Research Division at investment bank Morgan Stanley. He is noted for his views on the reshaping of the investment industry.

== Education ==
Van Steenis was educated at Trinity College, Oxford, where he graduated in Philosophy, Politics and Economics. In 1994, he went to INSEAD Business School where he obtained an MBA degree.

== Career ==
In 2004, while at Morgan Stanley, he coined the term the "Asset Management Barbell", "which predicted that the bulk of assets would be invested in low-cost passive or index-hugging products such as ETFs, with a small but significant amount in high margin" and "high alpha products, with intensifying pressure on the middle ground of more conventional asset management"

In 2012, he coined the term "Balkanisation of Banking Markets", to describe the breakdown in cross-border banking lending, as regulators looked to put up barriers to protect domestic markets and the policy challenge to rebuild a single market in lending within the Eurozone.

After Morgan Stanley, he was global head of strategy at Schroders, a British multinational asset management company.

On 1 May 2018, van Steenis was appointed, by Bank of England Governor Mark Carney, to lead a review of the UK's financial system intended "to strengthen the Bank’s agenda, toolkit and capabilities". The Review was published 20 June 2019 alongside the Bank's response to the Governor's Annual Mansion House Speech. Recommendations included updating regulations for digital payments, considering opening up the Bank's balance sheet to new payment firms, a climate stress test for financial institutions and championing low carbon transition disclosures. They also included far greater use of technology by regulators and new policies for financials institutions to use technology to improve their resilience.

After leaving the Bank of England, van Steenis was made adviser to the CEO at UBS, in addition to chairing the bank's sustainable finance committee.

In 2020, van Steenis was appointed co-chair of the World Economic Forum's Global Future Council on Financial Services 2020-21. He has commented favourably on several UK government policy initiatives, including the UK housing scheme Help to Buy with his colleague Charles Goodhart.

Van Steenis joined Oliver Wyman as Vice-Chair and Partner in 2022, supporting the firm's clients on their transition to lower emissions, before leaving in August 2026 to become Partner and European Economic & Policy Strategist at Apollo Global Management.

In 2015, van Steenis joined the Board of English National Opera. In 2020, van Steenis was appointed to the University of Oxford Endowment Investment Committee. In 2023, he was appointed to the Climate Advisory Board of NBIM, the Government Pension Fund of Norway.

== Awards and recognition ==
In 2009, van Steenis was named "European Banker of the Quarter" for Q1 2009 by The Wall Street Journal's Financial News for his work on the banking crisis and policy response. The judges describing him as "one of the most well regarded and influential voices commenting on issues facing the industry … who has helped to position the US bank as an authority on the European policy response to the crisis". Anthony Hilton, City Editor, Evening Standard called him as "one of the most authoritative banking analysts in Europe" His awards include being voted the number one equity research analyst for Banks and Diversified Financials twelve times in institutional investor polls.

He has won a number of forecasting awards including European "Stock Picker of the Year" for Banks and Financials in Reuter's Starmine twice. In 2008, van Steenis was tipped as "Rising Star Under 40" by The Wall Street Journal's Financial News for the third time. The judges said: "He was early to spot the implications of the funding crisis and warned investors to steer clear of single-A banks, forecast the majority of the sectors rights issues and dividend cuts and the financials portfolio he runs for Morgan Stanley has outperformed the sector by over 25% for the year".

== Personal life ==
Van Steenis is married to journalist and life peer Camilla Cavendish. He is the great nephew of Dutch botanist Cornelis Gijsbert Gerrit Jan van Steenis.
