= 100 Women in Finance =

Industry association for professionals in finance

- Type: Non-profit organization
- Industry: Financial Services
- Founded: 2001
- Headquarters: New York, NY
- Key people: Carol Kim, Dana Hall, Sarah Dyer (co-founders) and Rehana Farrell, (Chief Executive Officer)
- Members: 10,000+
- Number of employees: 15 (2026)
- Website: 100women.org

100 Women in Finance (100WF), formerly known as 100 Women in Hedge Funds (100WHF), is a global non-profit membership organization for women working in the finance industry. Founded in 2001, the organization works to strengthen women's representation across the finance sector by supporting members at every stage of their careers through education, peer engagement, and philanthropic initiatives.

== History ==
100WF traces its origins to December 2001, when three women working in the hedge fund industry in New York City, Sarah Dyer, Dana Hall, and Carol Kim, set out to bring together 100 senior female investment professionals so they could pool relationships and strengthen education within the alternative investment industry. The founders launched an inaugural education event in New York City under the name 100 Women in Hedge Funds, and within its first months identified peer engagement, philanthropy, and education as the three areas where its collective efforts could drive change in the industry and beyond.

The organization grew steadily over the following decade, expanding beyond its original hedge-fund membership base to include professionals from private equity, asset management, banking, and other corners of the finance industry. By its tenth anniversary it counted close to 20,000 subscribers spread across 21 locations on three continents, representing thousands of hedge funds, funds of funds, and institutional buyers, and had raised more than $40 million for charitable causes.

In December 2016, on the occasion of its 15th anniversary, the organization formally changed its name from 100 Women in Hedge Funds to 100 Women in Finance, adopting a new logo, visual identity, and website. Leadership at the time said the rebrand reflected the group's evolution from a small circle of hedge-fund professionals into a global network.

The inaugural CEO, Amanda Pullinger, led the organization through this period of rapid growth and expansion.

100WF marked its 25th anniversary in 2026 led by Chief Executive Officer, Rehana Farrell. The organization now operates a global network spanning 33 locations, with 10,00 members, over 35,000 subscribers and fueled by more than 600 volunteers and corporate partners.

== Mission and pillars ==
100WF describes its work as organized around three pillars:

- Education — Education and Professional Programming (both in-person and virtual) from thought leaders adn industry experts to help women to broaden perspectives, gain insights and sharpen skills at every stage of their career.
- Peer Engagement — We empower women with connections and resources, providing the opportunity for networking, career advancement and increased industry presence.
- Impact — We believe that expanding the pipeline of women entering finance, banking, and technology will increase female representation in leadership roles of these sectors.

== Structure and membership ==
100WF is a member-driven driven organization: it is run by a dynamic global staff of 15, led by CEO Rehana Farrell, COO/CDO Kellan Brown, together with a volunteer global association board, with local chapters ("locations") each organized by volunteer leadership committees. As of 2026, the organization is supported by more than 600 active volunteers implementing its mission across its network of 33 locations and over 300 events annually. Chapters included cities and regions such as New York, London, Milan, Toronto, Hong Kong, Singapore, Geneva, Zurich, Paris, Brazil, Chicago, Australia and the Cayman Islands, among others.

The organization is funded in large part through corporate sponsorships, typically from large financial institutions, alternative investment firms, and industry service providers.

== Programs and initiatives ==
- 100WFinTech — Connecting FinTech leaders and inspiring the Next Generation. 100WFinTech elevates the public profile of female FinTech leaders, enables their stronger interconnectivity to the FinTech ecosystem, and inspires the next generation of female FinTech talent.
- FundWomen — 100WF addresses the under-representation of women in investment roles and seeks to evolve the public perception of what an investment expert looks like. It is our hope that by increasing the visibility of today's female investment managers, we are also motivating the next generation of female investment talent to aspire to these roles.
- LaunchMe Mentorship Program — LaunchMe is 100 Women in Finance's global mentorship program, connecting students and early-career professionals with experienced industry professionals. Since its inception in 2022, the program has engaged over 1,400 participants across 19+ countries through one-to-one mentoring, group sessions, webinars, peer exchange and networking. The flagship six-month global mentorship program (1,400+ participants, 19+ countries).
- Peer Advisory Groups — Peer Advisory Groups are intimate circles of senior practitioners working in the same specialized areas. These groups, whose members are selected by invitation, provide an effective infrastructure for our more tenured members to engage with one another and leverage collective wisdom, skills and experience.
- Women on Boards — Split into Corporate/Private Boards and Non-Profit Boards tracks.

== Galas and fundraising ==
100WF holds annual fundraising galas honoring a senior woman in finance with an industry leadership award across each of its three regions; the Americas, EMEA & APAC.

Since its founding, the organization has said it has raised a cumulative total in the tens of millions of dollars for charitable and mission-aligned causes, and has hosted several hundred educational events globally.

== Notable patrons and affiliations ==
In 2010, Prince William became patron of 100 Women in Hedge Funds; in 2012 it was announced that he, his wife Catherine, and his brother Prince Harry would jointly serve as patrons of the organization's philanthropic initiatives beginning in 2013.
