= Healthcare in Berkshire =

Healthcare in Berkshire was the responsibility of five clinical commissioning groups until July 2022: Windsor, Ascot and Maidenhead, Slough, Bracknell and Ascot and Wokingham.

== History ==
From 1947 to 1965, NHS services in Berkshire were managed by two regional hospital boards: Oxford (eastern Berkshire) and the North-West Metropolitan (western Berkshire). In 1974, these boards were replaced by regional health authorities (RHAs), with Berkshire falling under the Oxford RHA.

In 1994, regions were reorganized, and Berkshire was moved to the Anglia and Oxford RHA. Initially, Berkshire had two area health authorities (shared with Buckinghamshire and Oxfordshire), which in 1982 were divided into East and West Berkshire district health authorities.

In 2002, RHAs were renamed strategic health authorities (SHAs), and Berkshire became part of Thames Valley SHA. Another reorganization in 2006 placed Berkshire under NHS South Central until its abolition in 2013. During this period, the area was served by two primary care trusts: Berkshire West and Berkshire East.

In March 2016, Sir Andrew Morris, Chief Executive of Frimley Health NHS Foundation Trust, became the leader of the Frimley Health Sustainability and Transformation Plan (STP) covering Bracknell and Ascot, North East Hampshire and Farnham, Slough, Surrey Heath, and Windsor, Ascot and Maidenhead CCGs. A separate STP footprint for Buckinghamshire, Oxfordshire, and Berkshire West was led by David Smith, Chief Executive of Oxfordshire CCG.

Since July 2022, clinical commissioning groups were replaced by integrated care systems (ICSs). These systems aim to improve collaboration and simplify healthcare management across regions, building on the goals of the earlier NHS reorganizations.

== Commissioning ==
In 2016, the Clinical Commissioning Groups (CCGs) in Berkshire launched the Connected Care programme. This system allows 102 GP practices, Royal Berkshire NHS Foundation Trust, Frimley Health NHS Foundation Trust, Berkshire Healthcare NHS Foundation Trust, South Central Ambulance Service, and six local councils in Berkshire to share patient records. Patients can also access their own records. The system uses CareCentric software by Graphnet, and the records of 855,000 patients are accessible to around 12,000 healthcare professionals.

The Newbury & District, North & West Reading, South Reading, and Wokingham CCGs were combined into Berkshire West CCG, forming the Berkshire West accountable care system. Similarly, Bracknell & Ascot, Slough, and Windsor, Ascot & Maidenhead CCGs merged into East Berkshire CCG in April 2018. These groups became part of the Frimley Health accountable care system.

== Primary care ==
There are 102 GP practices in the county. Out-of-hours services are provided by Berkshire Healthcare NHS Foundation Trust, South Central Ambulance Service and East Berkshire Primary Care Out of Hours.

== Acute services ==
Acute services are provided by Frimley Health NHS Foundation Trust and Royal Berkshire NHS Foundation Trust.

The county has two hospitals with accident and emergency facilities: Royal Berkshire Hospital in Reading and Wexham Park Hospital on the northern edge of Slough. Some parts of the county are closer to acute hospitals in other counties, including Frimley Park Hospital and Basingstoke and North Hampshire Hospital. The John Radcliffe Hospital in Oxford is the nearest major trauma centre to most of the county.

== Mental Health and Community Services ==
The main NHS provider is Berkshire Healthcare NHS Foundation Trust.

== Healthwatch ==
There are six local Healthwatches.

== See also ==
- Healthcare in the United Kingdom
