= Andrew Valentine Morris =

Former British National Health Service administrator

Sir Andrew Valentine Morris OBE Hon FRCP (born October 1955) is a former British hospital administrator who was the chair of NHS Improvement from October 2021 until the body's abolition in June 2022.

== Career ==
He was until February 2018 the Chief Executive of Frimley Health NHS Foundation Trust. His career within the English NHS spanned more than 40 years, joining as a hospital porter aged 19. Following stints in Leicester, Nottingham and Hereford, he was appointed unit general manager at Frimley Park Hospital, Surrey in 1989. He became its first chief executive in 1991 and remained in post till his retirement in 2018, making him one of the longest-serving chief executives in the NHS.

In 1996, he amalgamated the Cambridge Military Hospital with Frimley Park, leading to the incorporation of a Ministry of Defence hospital unit (MDHU) within the Trust. In 2005, Frimley Park Hospital was awarded foundation trust status and in 2014 it was the first NHS Trust to be awarded "outstanding" by the Care Quality Commission in its new inspection regime.

On 1 October 2014, Morris led the first NHS foundation trust takeover of another trust when Frimley Park Hospital took over Heatherwood and Wexham Park Hospitals in Berkshire, forming Frimley Health NHS Foundation Trust. The Wexham Park site had been graded "inadequate" by the CQC prior to the acquisition. Within a year, Wexham Park had been regraded as "good", a transformation considered 'the most impressive example of improvement' by Sir Mike Richards, the then chief inspector of hospitals.

In March 2016 he was appointed the leader of the Frimley Health sustainability and transformation plan footprint, which covers the areas of Bracknell and Ascot CCG, North East Hampshire and Farnham CCG, Slough CCG, Surrey Heath CCG and Windsor, Ascot and Maidenhead CCG.

In 2016 the Health Service Journal named him as the fourth most influential Chief Executive in the English National Health Service. In 2017, the same journal promoted him to the number one position, citing system leadership and mentoring other CEOs as important factors in deciding the rankings.

In February 2018, he retired from Frimley Health NHS Foundation Trust but continued as the lead for the Frimley Health and Care integrated care system (ICS).

== Post-retirement ==
On 20 July 2018, it was announced that Morris had been appointed as a non-executive director of NHS Improvement (NHSI), initially on a three-year term. Accordingly it was stated that he would be stepping down as the ICS lead in a managed transfer.

In December 2020, he was appointed vice-chair of the NHSI board.

From June to August 2021, Morris was Interim Chair of NHS Improvement after Baroness Dido Harding temporarily stood aside. He was subsequently appointed chair in October 2021 following Harding's resignation. He left this position following the body's abolition in June 2022; he became a deputy chair of NHS England the following month.As of April 2025, Morris has been a non-executive director of University Hospitals Birmingham NHS Foundation Trust.

== Honours and awards ==
Morris was appointed an officer of the Order of the British Empire in the Queen's 2002 Golden Jubilee Honours and knighted in the 2015 New Year Honours, on both occasions for services to the NHS.

Sir Andrew was awarded honorary Fellowship of the Royal College of Physicians of London in May 2016 for his contribution to healthcare administration.
