= Graphnet =

British healthcare software company

Graphnet is a UK provider of healthcare software based in Milton Keynes, Buckinghamshire. The company was founded in 1994. It specialises in shared care records and claims to be "the UK’s leading supplier of shared care record software to the NHS and care services". It is part of the System C & Graphnet Care Alliance which runs the National Immunisation Management System that the NHS uses to invite people for coronavirus vaccines and track who has received the jabs. CVC Capital Partners is an investor in both partners. It acquired the remote patient monitoring specialist Docobo in 2021. This is intended to help Integrated Care Systems, NHS trusts and councils to reduce avoidable hospital admissions. It joined the Professional Record Standards Body's Standards Partnership Scheme in 2022.

It is not connected to Graphnet, Inc., based in the US.

Graphnet has a contract using its CareCentric software in Berkshire for a Connected Care programme which will enable the 102 GP practices, Royal Berkshire NHS Foundation Trust, Frimley Health NHS Foundation Trust, Berkshire Healthcare NHS Foundation Trust, South Central Ambulance Service, and the six local authorities across the county to share records – and enable patients to view their own records. Records of 855,000 patients will be used by about 12,000 health and care professionals.

Graphnet is also developing a system which will make available an integrated record of key information to clinicians across Greater Manchester.

It will provide the integrated care record for the Black Country and West Birmingham integrated care system. The system known as the One Health and Care record is already in use in Kent and Medway, Shropshire and Staffordshire.
