= Tom Bristow =

English rugby union player

- Born: Thomas Andrew Bristow; 16 August 1991 (age 35) Hong Kong
- Height: 1.83 m (6 ft 0 in)
- Weight: 118 kg (18 st 8 lb)
- School: Tomlinscote School
- University: Northumbria University

Rugby union career
- Position: Loosehead Prop
- Current team: Hong Kong Rugby Union
Senior career
Years	Team	Apps	(Points)
2012–2013	London Welsh	43	(0)
2013–2015	Leicester Tigers	14	(0)
2015–2017	Wasps	24	(0)
2017–2018	RC Narbonne	24	(0)
2018-2019	Sale Sharks	15	(5)
2019-	Hong Kong Rugby Union	2	(0)
2020-	South China Tigers	1	(0)
- Correct as of 14 March 2020
International career
Years	Team	Apps	(Points)
2019	Hong Kong Rugby Union	2	(0)
- Correct as of 17 December

Tom Bristow (born 16 August 1991) is a retired international English rugby union loosehead prop. He represented Hong Kong Rugby Union at international level in November 2019. He made his test debut against Belgium national rugby union team and Spain national rugby union team in the Europe test matches.

== Early life ==
Bristow was born in Hong Kong, and attended Tomlinscote School and Sixth Form College in Frimley. In 2018 Bristow graduated from Northumbria University with a BA (Hons) in Leadership and Management.

In May 2012 Bristow was part of the Surrey team which won the County Shield, beating Leicestershire 43–12 in the final at Twickenham. The loosehead's abilities were spotted by Harlequins and in October 2011 he was called up by Quins to play in the Aviva A League against Saracens at Woolam Playing Fields. Bristow impressed enough in a good 60-minute shift to be asked back and he made two further appearances for Harlequins in the Aviva A League against Gloucester and London Irish.

Bristow has also played for Bedford Blues, Chobham Rugby Club, Guildford Rugby Club, Camberley Rugby Club and Dorking R.F.C.

== Professional career ==
Bristow joined the promoted London Welsh RFC for there flight in the Premiership Rugby from the amateur club Dorking R.F.C., whom he helped secure a top-five finish in National League Three. Bristow was sponsored by the fashion-focused brand Storm Watches whilst at London Welsh RFC. At 21-year-old he played 21 Premiership games for the Exiles last season.

On 15 July 2013, Bristow signed for Leicester Tigers for the start of 2013–14 season. Bristow stated in an interview "I enjoyed my experience with London Welsh in the Aviva Premiership last season but I'm happy to be here now and delighted to have the opportunity with Leicester Tigers. I'm looking forward to settling in during the pre-season and being part of the Tigers squad." Tigers director of rugby Richard Cockerill told the club's official website: "Tom is a young up-and-coming prop and he joins a very good bunch of promising young front rows at the club".

On 22 May 2015 Bristow joined Premiership Rugby rivals Wasps for the upcoming 2015–16 season. Bristow stated "Playing in Europe is a great experience across the whole day. You have the big French crowds when you arrive, and the whole thing feels another step up from the Premiership. You have to stay composed in that situation, do your bread-and-butter and make sure you stay focused. The leaders in the team like Joe Launchbury and Jimmy Gopperth are very good at making sure the younger players stay calm, while the amount everyone talks on the pitch is a great help." On 19 June 2017 Bristow confirmed he would be leaving the club.

On 9 August 2017 it was confirmed that Bristow signed for French club RC Narbonne in the Pro D2 upcoming 2017–18 season.

=== 2018: Return to the Premiership ===
On 10 October 2018 Bristow joined Premiership Rugby Sale Sharks. Bristow said: "It’s a bit different at Carrington from the South of France but great to be back in the U.K". Sale Sharks director of rugby Steve Diamond welcomed Bristow's addition to the Premiership Rugby club "We will offer him a warm welcome to the Sharks squad and he will significantly improve our options in the front-row". On 16 May 2019 Bristow confirmed he would be leaving the club.

=== 2019: Return to Hong Kong ===
On 29 July 2019, Bristow joined HKRFU Premiership Kowloon RFC rugby team for the upcoming 2019–2020 season. On 12 November 2019 Bristow was confirmed he would be part of Hong Kong Rugby Union European test match tour to face Spain national rugby union team and Belgium national rugby union team. Bristow was capped for both test matches.

Bristow was picked to play for the Hong Kong South China Tigers rugby team in the fast pace international rugby union 2020 Global Rapid Rugby competition. He was picked as a 'player to watch' throughout the competition.
