= Battle, Reading =

Battle, Reading may be a reference to:

- Battle Hospital, Reading, a former hospital in the town of Reading, Berkshire, UK
- Battle Ward, Reading, an electoral ward in the town of Reading, Berkshire, UK

== See also ==
- Battle of Reading (disambiguation)
