= Heatherwood and Wexham Park Hospitals NHS Foundation Trust =

Healthcare trust in England

- Type: NHS hospital trust
- Disbanded: October 2014
- Region served: Slough, Ascot
- Hospitals: Wexham Park Hospital; Heatherwood Hospital

Heatherwood and Wexham Park Hospitals NHS Foundation Trust ran Heatherwood Hospital in Ascot and Wexham Park Hospital near Slough, Berkshire, England.

Julie Burgess, the chief executive resigned in September 2011

In October 2013 it became known that there was a plan for the Trust being taken over by Frimley Park Hospital NHS Foundation Trust.

In October 2013 as a result of the Keogh Review the Trust was put into the highest risk category by the Care Quality Commission

In November 2013 a letter, signed by 24 ethnic minority consultants, containing allegations of 'bullying, harassment and racial discrimination’ was leaked to the Mail on Sunday. This was followed by further letters from other consultants admitting that there was an unduly low threshold for disciplinary action, but denying racial bias.

In January 2014 it was announced that Philippa Slinger, the former chief executive of the Trust is to join Care UK.

The Trust was placed in special measures by Monitor (NHS) in May 2014 after an inspection by the Care Quality Commission which found that unsafe staffing levels were a “consistent theme” throughout the trust, with heavy reliance on agency staff and failure to consistently meet national targets to admit, transfer or discharge patients from the A&E department within four hours. Arrangements were made with Frimley Park Hospital NHS Foundation Trust to support the organisation, and it was expected to take over the Trust in the summer of 2014.

The Trust was finally taken over in October 2014 and a new organisation, Frimley Health NHS Foundation Trust created.

== See also ==
- List of NHS trusts
