= Vic Niblett =

English footballer

Personal information
- Full name: Victor Niblett
- Date of birth: 9 December 1924
- Place of birth: Frimley, England
- Date of death: 2004 (aged 79–80)
- Place of death: Gillingham, England
- Position: Defender

Senior career*
Years	Team	Apps	(Gls)
1944–1950	Reading	6	(0)
1950–1951	West Ham United	0	(0)
1951–1956	Gillingham	154	(0)
- * Club domestic league appearances and goals as of 13:05, 11 December 2007 (UTC)

Victor Niblett (9 December 1924 – 2004) was an English professional footballer. His clubs included Reading, West Ham United, and Gillingham, where he made over 150 Football League appearances.
