= Berkshire Healthcare NHS Foundation Trust =

Mental healthcare provider in Berkshire, England

Coordinates: 51.4168°N 0.7547°W

- Type: Mental health trust Community health trust
- Established: 2 May 2007
- Chair: Martin Earwicker
- Chief executive: Julian Emms
- Staff: 5,000
- Website: www.berkshirehealthcare.nhs.uk

Berkshire Healthcare NHS Foundation Trust provides mental health services and other community based health services, primarily to the resident population of the Royal County of Berkshire, England, in the United Kingdom.

Berkshire Healthcare NHS Foundation Trust was established as an NHS Trust on 1 April 2000 following the dissolution of two former NHS organisations on 31 March 2000, namely West Berkshire Priority Care NHS Trust and East Berkshire Learning Disability NHS Trust. Mental health services were also transferred from Heatherwood & Wexham Park NHS Trust. On 2 May 2007, Berkshire Healthcare NHS Trust was licensed as a foundation trust.

== Services ==
Berkshire Healthcare NHS Foundation Trust is a widely dispersed organisation with clinical services at several locations across the whole of the Royal County of Berkshire.

Services at the trust are broadly divided into three provision areas; Adult Community and Mental Health, Children, Young People, and Families (CYPF), and Talking Therapies.

The majority of community mental health services are aligned with the six unitary authorities of Berkshire of Slough Borough Council; Royal Borough of Windsor & Maidenhead; Bracknell Forest Borough Council; Wokingham Borough Council; Reading Borough Council and West Berkshire District Council. Each unitary authority area has its own Community Mental Health Team which provides teams of social service and health workers providing a joined up care and support to those in need of mental health support in those locations.

Inpatient services are provided in four locations across the Royal County of Berkshire: St Mark's Hospital in Maidenhead; Wexham Park Hospital in Slough, Berkshire; Heatherwood Hospital in Ascot, Berkshire; and Prospect Park Hospital in Reading, Berkshire.

Buckinghamshire, Berkshire East and Berkshire West primary care trusts produced a strategy document, called Care for the Future in August 2011 in which it was proposed to develop community services and reduce hospital provision in the area.

In December 2013 it was announced that the Charles Ward in St Mark's Hospital in Maidenhead would be moved to Prospect Park Hospital in January 2013.

In June 2015 the trust took over a GP practice run by Specialist Health Services in Priory Avenue, Reading, Berkshire which had been condemned by the Care Quality Commission as inadequate. It had been placed in Special measures but the CQC pronounced it much improved in October 2015.

In March 2020 the trust received an overall rating of 'Outstanding' by the Care Quality Commission.

== Accreditations and recognition ==
=== Global Digital Accreditation (GDE) ===
In March 2021 the trust became the first of seven Community and Mental Health NHS trusts in England to achieve Global Digital Exemplar (GDE) accreditation.

=== Veterans Mental Health ===
In July 2022 the trust received the Employer Recognition Scheme Gold Award, the highest level of accreditation bestowed by the Ministry of Defence.

The award recognises the support provided to all those with a connection to the Armed Forces including reservists, veterans, cadet force adult volunteers and spouses/partner.

Julian Emms, Chief Executive at Berkshire Healthcare NHS Foundation Trust, said:

"We're delighted to be recognised with a Gold award, which reflects our long-term commitment to being a forces-friendly employer. The valuable skills and experience that veterans gain during their time in the forces is a real asset so it's really important to us that we recognise their contribution and give veterans, reservists and their families every opportunity to build a fulfilling career at Berkshire Healthcare NHS Foundation Trust."

== Performance ==
It was named by the Health Service Journal as one of the top hundred NHS trusts to work for in 2015. At that time it had 3532 full time equivalent staff and a sickness absence rate of 4%. 71% of staff recommend it as a place for treatment and 62% recommended it as a place to work.

== See also ==
- List of all Berkshire Healthcare Adult Mental Health and Community services
- List of NHS trusts
- Global Digital Exemplars (GDE)
