= Battle Hospital =

- Royal Berkshire NHS Foundation Trust
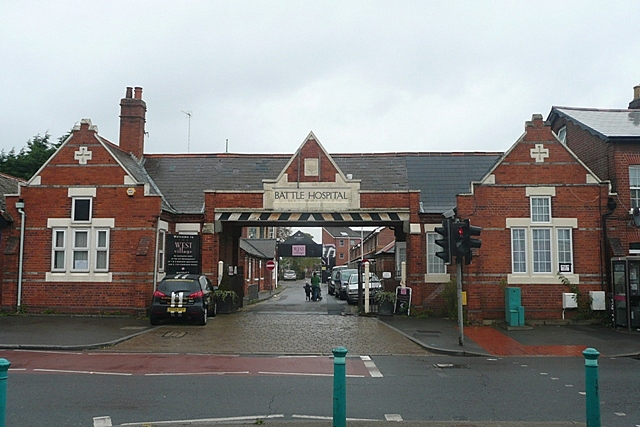
- Battle Hospital entrance

- Location within Reading

Geography
- Location: Reading, United Kingdom
- Coordinates: 51.458339°N 0.997696°W

Organisation
- Care system: Public NHS
- Type: General

Services
- Emergency department: No Accident & Emergency
- Beds: 280 (1993)

History
- Founded: 1867
- Closed: 2005

Links
- Website: http://www.royalberkshire.nhs.uk/
- Lists: Hospitals in the United Kingdom

Battle Hospital was a National Health Service hospital in the town of Reading in the English county of Berkshire. The hospital was located on a large site between Oxford Road and Portman Road, in West Reading. Before adopting the name Battle Hospital, it was known as the Reading Union Workhouse and the Reading War Hospital No.1.

== History ==
Battle Hospital began its life in 1867 as a workhouse, the Reading Union Workhouse. Between 1889 and 1892 an infirmary was added with 185 beds for vagrants. During the First World War it became the Reading War Hospital No.1, serving as the hub for a number of other such hospitals.

In 1930 it became a municipal hospital, taking the name Battle Hospital for the first time. In 1948, by now with 384 beds, Battle Hospital became a general hospital under the new National Health Service. In 1952 a new maternity unit, Thames Block, opened. In 1972 the new single storey Abbey block opened. By 1993, Battle Hospital had 280 beds, compared with 760 beds at Reading's other general hospital, the Royal Berkshire Hospital. Both hospitals were administered by the Royal Berkshire and Battle Hospitals NHS Trust.

In 2005 the hospital closed, with all its patients and services transferred to the Royal Berkshire Hospital. A new block at that hospital, built to accommodate the extra capacity required to support this move, was named the Battle Block.

The hospital has since been demolished. The western half of the site is now occupied by a large Tesco supermarket, with its supporting car parks and filling station. The eastern part of the site has been redeveloped as a housing estate.
