= Benham Hill =

Coordinates: 51°24′18″N 1°17′31″W

- Hamlet
- Location within Berkshire
- OS grid reference: SU493676
- Unitary authority: West Berkshire
- Ceremonial county: Berkshire
- Region: South East
- Country: England
- Sovereign state: United Kingdom
- Postcode district: RG18
- Dialling code: 01635
- Police: Thames Valley
- Fire: Royal Berkshire
- Ambulance: South Central
- UK Parliament: Berkshire

Benham Hill is a small settlement on the border of the civil parishes of Newbury and Thatcham in the English county of Berkshire.

The settlement lies on the A4 road, and is previously the site of the Turnpike School, now West Berkshire Community Hospital.
