= West Berkshire Community Hospital =

English community hospital

- Berkshire Healthcare NHS Foundation Trust
- Shown in Berkshire

Geography
- Location: Newbury, Berkshire, England
- Coordinates: 51.406°N 1.292°W

Organisation
- Care system: National Health Service
- Type: Community

Services
- Emergency department: No
- Beds: 60

History
- Founded: 2004

Links
- Website: www.berkshirehealthcare.nhs.uk/our-sites/west-berkshire/west-berkshire-community-hospital/

West Berkshire Community Hospital is a small hospital located in the Benham Hill area of Newbury, in West Berkshire, England. It is managed by Berkshire Healthcare NHS Foundation Trust.

== History ==
The hospital, established to replace the services previously provided by Newbury and Sandleford hospitals, was officially opened by Princess Anne in October 2004. A new renal and cancer care unit under construction at the hospital is due to be completed later in 2018.

It is to have one of the 40 diagnostic community centres which are intended to expand the range of diagnostic services available outside hospitals.

== See also ==
- List of hospitals in England
