= Golden Jubilee of Elizabeth II =

50th anniversary of the monarch's accession

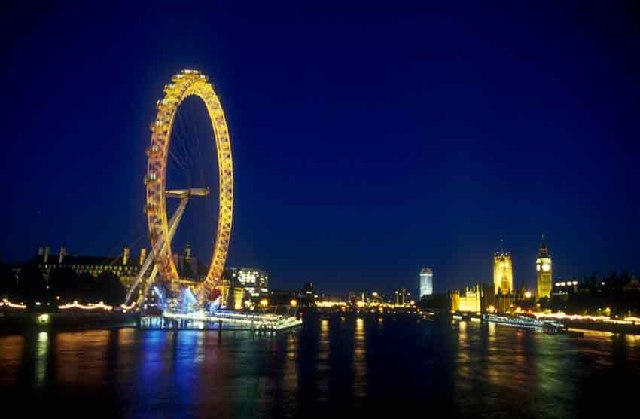
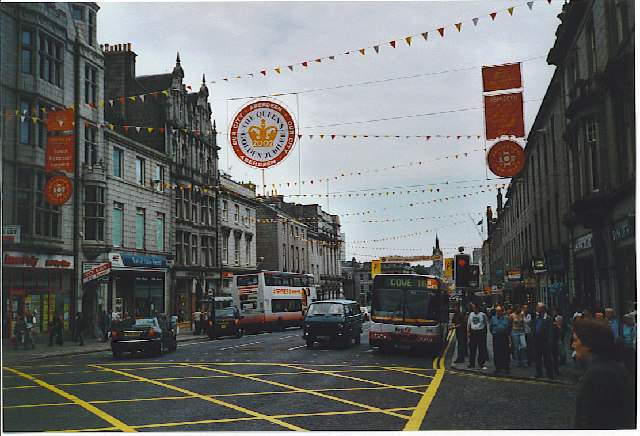
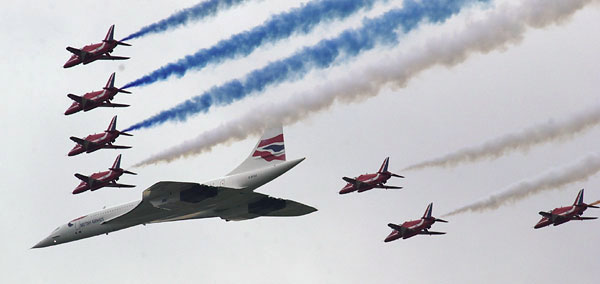
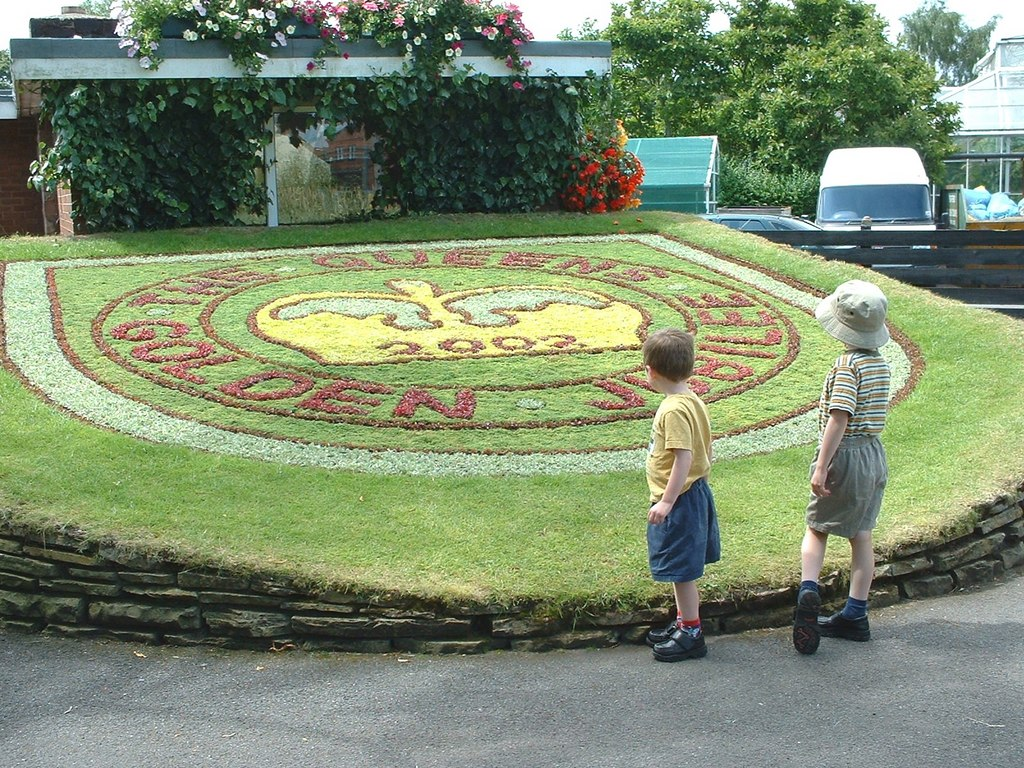
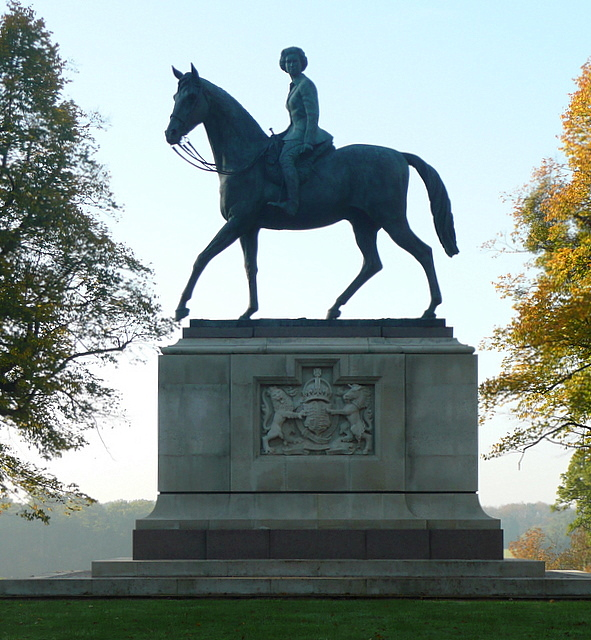
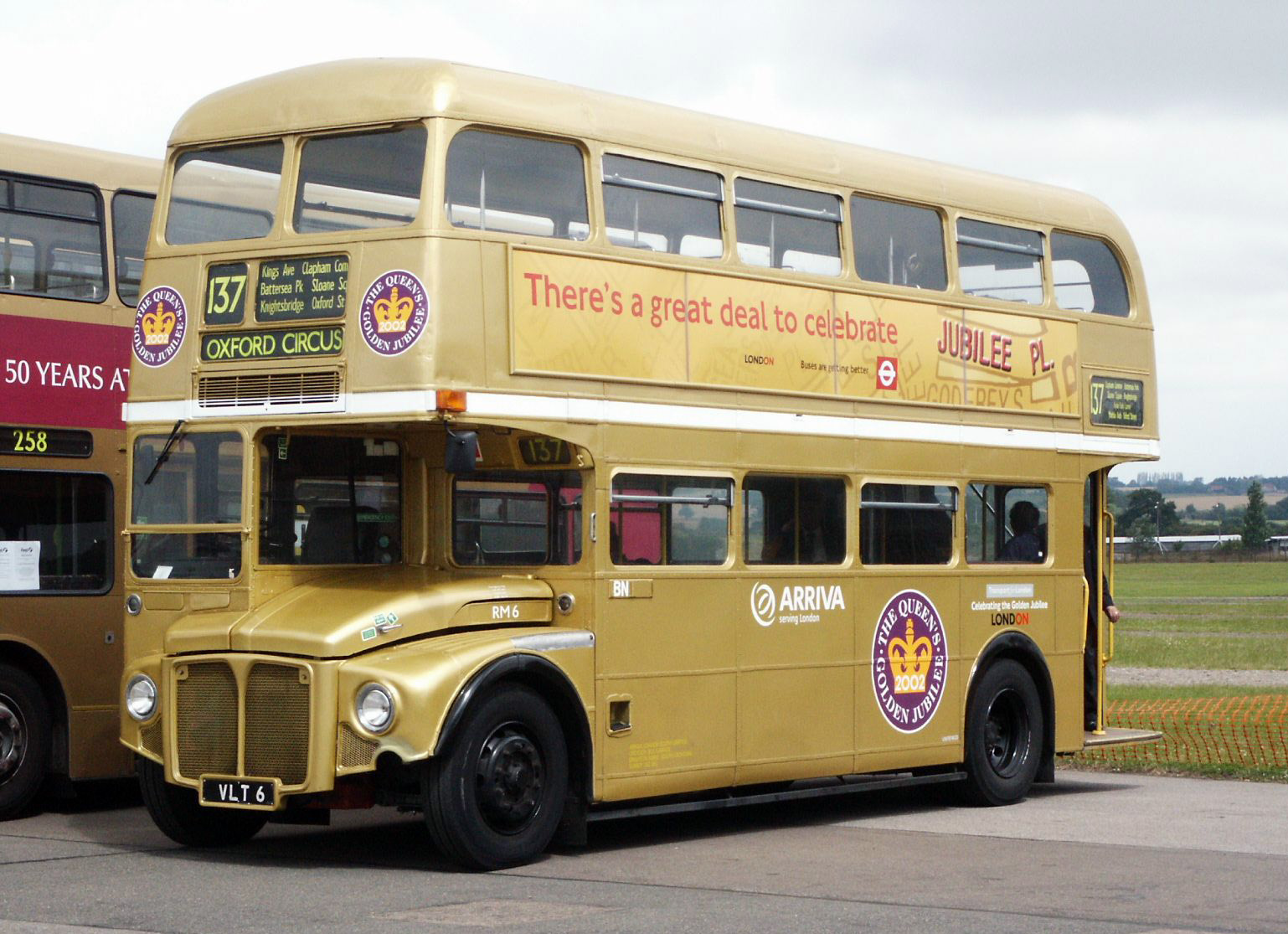
- Collage of commemorations of the jubilee, Clockwise: The London Eye illuminated in gold; Concorde parade flight with the Red Arrows; Flower arrangement in Stafford; Routemaster in Golden Jubilee livery; Equestrian statue of the Queen erected in Windsor Park; Union Street in Aberdeen with Golden Jubilee bunting
- Genre: Jubilee of the monarch of the United Kingdom and the other Commonwealth realms
- Date: 6 February 2002; 24 years ago
- Country: United Kingdom; Canada; Australia; New Zealand; Commonwealth of Nations
- Previous event: Ruby Jubilee of Elizabeth II
- Next event: Diamond Jubilee of Elizabeth II
- Website: goldenjubilee.gov.uk

The Golden Jubilee of Elizabeth II was the international celebration held in 2002 marking the 50th anniversary of the accession of Queen Elizabeth II on 6 February 1952. It was intended by the Queen to be both a commemoration of her 50 years as monarch and an opportunity for her to officially and personally thank her people for their loyalty.

Despite the deaths of her sister, Princess Margaret, and her mother, Queen Elizabeth the Queen Mother, in February and March 2002 respectively, and predictions in the media that the anniversary would be a non-event, the jubilee was marked with large-scale and popular events throughout London in June of the same year, bookended by events throughout the Commonwealth realms. Elizabeth attended all of the official celebrations as scheduled, along with her husband, Prince Philip, Duke of Edinburgh; over 12 months, the royal couple journeyed more than 40,000 miles (64,000 km) to the Caribbean, Australia, New Zealand, then around the United Kingdom, and wrapped up the jubilee year in Canada. Numerous landmarks, parks, buildings, and the like, were also named in honour of the golden jubilee and commemorative medals, stamps, and other symbols were issued.

There were six key themes of the Golden Jubilee celebrations: 'Celebration', 'Giving Thanks', 'Service', 'Involving the Whole Community', 'Looking Forward as Well as Back', and 'Commonwealth'.

== Queen's Jubilee message ==
In her Golden Jubilee message, the Queen said that "this anniversary is for us an occasion to acknowledge with gratitude the loyalty and support which we have received from so many people since I came to the Throne in 1952. It is especially an opportunity to thank all those of you who help others in your own local communities through public or voluntary service. I would like to think that your work will be particularly recognised during this Jubilee year. I hope also that this time of celebration in the United Kingdom and across the Commonwealth will not simply be an occasion to be nostalgic about the past. I believe that, young or old, we have as much to look forward to with confidence and hope as we have to look back on with pride".

== Celebrations in the Commonwealth ==
=== Australia ===
As Queen of Australia, under your constitution, and as Head of the Commonwealth, I look forward to the coming few days here. I look around tonight and I am aware both of my responsibilities, and of the pleasure those responsibilities bring. And in this Golden Jubilee year, I cannot but reflect on the extraordinary opportunity I have been given to serve the people of this great country. The way Australia evolves over the next fifty years is in your hands.

— Elizabeth II of Australia, 2002

The Royal Australian Mint released commemorative coins to mark the Queen's Golden Jubilee.

To mark her Golden Jubilee as Queen of Australia, Queen Elizabeth II toured the country. She was on 27 February received in Adelaide by the Governor-General, Peter Hollingworth; the Australian viceroy, at the time, was in the midst of controversy involving allegations of child abuse cover-ups in the Anglican Church and demonstrators were present when the Queen and Prince Philip landed. The royal couple undertook a five-day tour through South Australia and Queensland, which also coincided with that year's Commonwealth Heads of Government Meeting in Coolum Beach. On the Queen's Birthday holiday for 2002, services of thanksgiving were held in churches and a bonfire was lit during a party at the Governor-General's residence in Canberra.

=== Canada ===
The Queen's official logo for her Golden Jubilee as Queen of Canada

Queen Elizabeth II's official Golden Jubilee portrait for Canada

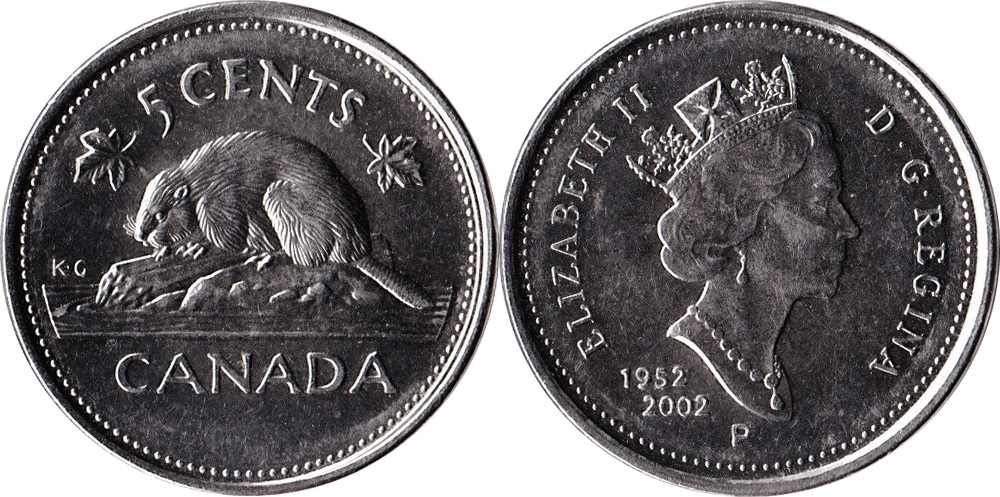
All Canadian coins minted in 2002 have a commemorative double-date on the obverse side: "1952–2002", to commemorate the Queen's Golden Jubilee.

Throughout the year, events were held across Canada to mark the Golden Jubilee, such as the Jubilee Levée held by Lieutenant Governor of Alberta Lois Hole, which was attended by more than 4,000 Albertans and at which Hole stated: "what we want to realize is how important the monarchy is to Canada and certainly to Alberta."

==== Royal tour ====
Her Majesty The Queen of Canada has been unfalteringly by our side to celebrate our successes and to help us to grow together. Fifty years after her Accession to the Throne, Elizabeth II remains a symbol of continuity, stability and tradition in a world that is under a barrage of constant change. That is why Canadians are proud to celebrate the Golden Jubilee.

— Sheila Copps, Minister of Canadian Heritage, 2002

For 12 days in October 2002, the Queen and the Duke of Edinburgh toured Canada, making stops in Victoria, Vancouver, Winnipeg, Toronto, Hamilton, Hull, Fredericton, Sussex, Moncton, and Ottawa.

In Nunavut, the Queen addressed the new legislative assembly, stating in her speech: "I am proud to be the first member of the Canadian Royal Family to be greeted in Canada's newest territory." In the British Columbia Parliament Buildings, the Queen unveiled a stained glass window commemorating the Golden Jubilee. In Vancouver, on 6 October, the Queen, accompanied by Wayne Gretzky, and in front of a crowd of 18,000 at General Motors Place, dropped the ceremonial first puck for the National Hockey League exhibition game between the Vancouver Canucks and San Jose Sharks; this was the first time any reigning monarch, Canadian or otherwise, had performed the task. In Saskatchewan, the Queen unveiled on the grounds of the provincial parliament the product of the Golden Jubilee Statue Project: a bronze equestrian statue of her riding Burmese, a horse gifted in 1969 to her by the RCMP. In Ontario, the Queen attended at the Canadian Broadcasting Corporation's Toronto headquarters an event marking the organisation's 50th anniversary; there, she viewed exhibits and was amused by a video display showing her earlier tours of Canada in the 1950s. In Moncton, New Brunswick, the Queen and the Duke attended a luncheon in Dieppe to celebrate the town's 50th anniversary and officially opened a new terminal at Greater Moncton International Airport. In Ottawa, on 13 October, a multi-faith Thanksgiving celebration was held on Parliament Hill for about 3,500 people, and the Queen laid a wreath at the Tomb of the Unknown Soldier. A state dinner was held that evening at the Canadian Museum of Civilization in Gatineau, Quebec, at which Her Majesty said: "[I wish] to express my profound gratitude to all Canadians... for the loyalty, encouragement and support you have given to me over these past 50 years."

Canada's federal government issued medals to mark the anniversary of the queen's reign in 2002. They were awarded to several thousand Canadians for significant contributions and achievements.

==== Legacy ====
It was argued in retrospective analysis that the jubilee had been of benefit both to nationalism and the monarchy; The Globe and Mail said: "When she daintily bent over to drop a puck at an NHL game... she achieved perhaps the most brilliant melding of symbolism in Canadian history... The Jumbotron in Vancouver's GM Place said it all, flashing the Queen's golden EIIR cypher on the giant screen atop the beer advertisement: 'I am Canadian'. The crowd went hysterical."

=== Jamaica ===
Prince Philip and I have a unique opportunity to see and hear about these ways in which you are meeting the challenge of giving every Jamaican a stake in the future during our short visit in this year which marks both Jamaica's fortieth anniversary of Independence and my Golden Jubilee. Such anniversaries are important.

— Elizabeth II of Jamaica, 2002

Elizabeth's first official engagements related to the Golden Jubilee took place in Jamaica. The Queen's Jubilee tour also coincided with the country's 40th anniversary of independence. She arrived for the celebrations on 18 February 2002, nine days following the death of her sister, Princess Margaret, Countess of Snowdon; the Queen established a short period of private, though not state, mourning. Elizabeth was first welcomed in Montego Bay, after which she travelled to Kingston and stayed at her Jamaican prime minister's residence, Jamaica House.

Despite some anti-monarchical sentiment in the country at the time, the Queen and the Duke of Edinburgh were "enthusiastically welcomed" by Jamaicans; 57 per cent of those polled said the visit was important to the country and large crowds turned out to see Elizabeth, though there were small protests by Rastafarians seeking reparations for slavery and their repatriation to Africa. The Queen received an official welcome at King's House, the Governor-General's residence, met with Jamaican veterans of the First World War, addressed her Jamaican parliament, and visited an underprivileged area of Kingston, known as Trenchtown, viewing urban poverty projects while there. The tour ended on a unique note when, at the final banquet in Jamaica, a power outage plunged King's House into darkness during the meal; Elizabeth described the event as "memorable".

=== New Zealand ===
==== Jubilee commemorations ====
A number of activities marking the Queen's Golden Jubilee as Queen of New Zealand, the Queen's first visit to New Zealand as Sovereign in 1953–54, and subsequent royal visits, took place in New Zealand.

"Queen Elizabeth II has been Queen of New Zealand for fifty years and is held in warm regard by New Zealanders. It is fitting that we honour her on the occasion of the Golden Jubilee", said Prime Minister Helen Clark.

NZ Post issued a set of Golden Jubilee and Royal Visit stamps. The Reserve Bank of New Zealand issued a commemorative Royal Visit coin in October 2001.

The Queen's Birthday and Golden Jubilee Honours 2002 were announced on 3 June.

An ecumenical service of thanksgiving for the Golden Jubilee was held on 7 June at the Wellington Cathedral of St Paul. The service was attended by the Governor-General Silvia Cartwright and representatives of the government and the New Zealand Defence Force. Members of the public were also encouraged to attend.

Parliament's Visitor Centre displayed memorabilia of royal visits of the past one hundred years. The Ministry for Culture and Heritage hosted an online exhibition on the 1953–54 visit on its website. New Zealanders were asked to submit the memories of the royal visit exhibition to highlight the importance of royal visits for many people.

Te Papa, the national museum, hosted a major exhibition on the 1953–54 royal visit which opened in May 2003.

==== Royal tour ====
It is both a privilege and a pleasure to have served as Queen of New Zealand for these fifty years. I thank you all for the loyalty and support you have given to me throughout this time.

— Elizabeth II of New Zealand, 2002

Following her tour of Jamaica, the Queen next toured New Zealand, making stops in Auckland, Taupō, Christchurch, and Wellington. She and the Duke of Edinburgh arrived in the country on 22 February, just after Prime Minister Helen Clark said in a speech that she felt it "inevitable that New Zealand will become a republic." The royal couple were greeted by the Governor-General and other officials when they disembarked from the Royal Flight; Clark was absent, as she was at a meeting of centre-left leaders in Stockholm, Sweden. A low turn out was reported to see the Queen when she arrived at the airport, while an estimated 4,000 people came to view the Queen in Auckland. During the tour, the Queen met the world's first transsexual MP Georgina Beyer.

The Queen was presented with a gift from the government and people of New Zealand of the Dictionary of New Zealand Biography and the New Zealand Historical Atlas.

=== Papua New Guinea ===
To commemorate the Queen's Golden Jubilee, a fine arts exhibition, entitled 20 Portraits and other Works, was held in Papua New Guinea in June 2002. Artists were asked to display a portrait of the Queen, specially made for the exhibition. The winning portrait by painter Laben John was presented as a gift to the Queen by Jean Kekedo, Papua New Guinean High Commissioner to the UK, on 16 July 2002. The runner-up portrait—Her Majesty in the Land of the Unexpected—painted by Jeffry Feeger, depicts the Queen in Papua New Guinean traditional regalia. The painting was sent to Papua New Guinean High Commission in London, where it is on permanent display.

=== Saint Lucia ===
The Golden Jubilee festivities in Saint Lucia started in February 2002 and continued until February 2003. The year-long commemoration featured a military tattoo on Mindoo Phillip Park and a reception for the Queen's birthday at Government House, among other events. The themes for Saint Lucia's Jubilee celebrations included the Commonwealth, celebration, community service, looking forward, looking backward and giving thanks.

On June 9, Governor-General Dame Pearlette Louisy led a Service of Celebration at the Minor Basilica of the Immaculate Conception to commemorate the Queen's Golden Jubilee. Governor-General Louisy, Prime Minister Kenny Anthony, and several others honoured the Queen during the ceremony.

The government of Saint Lucia announced in its 2002 Throne Speech that to celebrate the Queen's Jubilee in a significant national way, it had declared the year the "Jubilee Year of the Arts". Two main events were held that year: the National Arts Festival and Awards and the observance of the 20th anniversary of the National Festival of Lights.

=== United Kingdom ===
The official emblem of the Queen's Golden Jubilee in the United Kingdom

Celebrations for Elizabeth II's Golden Jubilee took place throughout the United Kingdom between May and July 2002. In the lead-up to those festive weeks, the British media—The Guardian, in particular—predicted that the jubilee would be a failure, arguing that Britain was no longer interested in the monarchy; a pervading sense of apathy amongst the populace seemed to confirm this. However, the predictions were proven wrong, especially during the official jubilee weekend, when people numbering in the hundreds of thousands turned out to participate in the fêtes. These festivities culminated in the 4 June event on The Mall in London, when over one million attended the parade and flypast.

It was on 3 March that the Queen and the Duke of Edinburgh returned to London from Australia. Eight days later, on Commonwealth Day, the Commonwealth Secretariat unveiled at Buckingham Palace a portrait of Elizabeth, painted by Chinwe Chukwuogo-Roy that had been commissioned to mark the Queen's 50 years as Head of the Commonwealth; the work now hangs at Marlborough House, with a study kept as part of the Queen's collection at St James's Palace. British artist Lucian Freud had also presented the Queen with a portrait of her wearing a diamond crown at Buckingham Palace, which was commissioned by the Royal Household and later displaced at the exhibition Royal Treasures: A Golden Jubilee Celebration. At the end of the month, however, the Queen was dealt another blow when her mother died on 30 March; the Commonwealth realms observed a period of mourning, and on 9 April, the day of her funeral, more than one million people filled the area outside Westminster Abbey and along the 23-mile (37 km) route from central London to the Queen Mother's final resting place beside her husband and younger daughter in St George's Chapel at Windsor Castle.

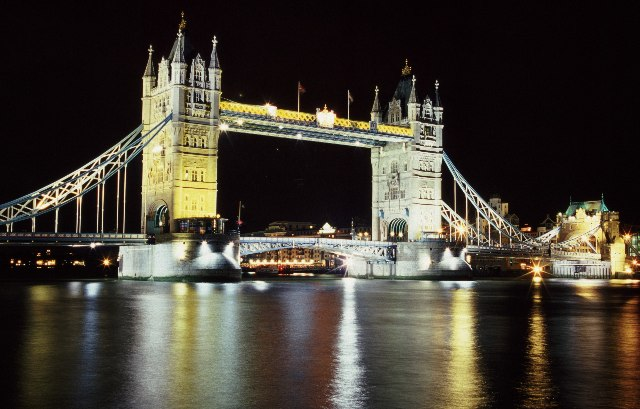
Tower Bridge floodlit in gold in celebration of the Queen's Golden Jubilee

We all have our personal memories of the Queen's reign over the last 50 years. I was just three weeks old at the time of her coronation and as a schoolboy in Durham during the 1960s, I remember seeing the Queen for the first time. It is a privilege now to serve her as her 10th Prime Minister—her first, as she reminded me in May 1997, was Winston Churchill, who was her Prime Minister before I was born. In the many meetings that I have had with Her Majesty since 1997, I have, time and again, as have my predecessors, had reason to be grateful to her for her wisdom, good sense and experience, which she always brings to the issues of the day.

— Tony Blair, Prime Minister of the United Kingdom, 2002

Plans for the Golden Jubilee in the United Kingdom went ahead as planned, and, after a dinner hosted by Tony Blair at 10 Downing Street for her and all her living former British prime ministers (Sir John Major, Margaret Thatcher, Sir Edward Heath, and James Callaghan), the Queen officially launched the celebrations in the UK with a speech to both houses of the British parliament at Westminster Hall on 30 April, marking the fifth time in five decades that Elizabeth II addressed her British parliament on her own account. The Queen spoke of 50 unforgettable years and the changes to British life and society in that time, and elaborated that the monarchy must change also; Elizabeth said she had "witnessed the transformation of the international landscape through which [the United Kingdom] must chart its course" and declared her "resolve to continue, with the support of [the Royal Family], to serve the people... to the best of [her] ability through the changing times ahead."

Amongst several other events independently organised to celebrate the Jubilee in 2002 were the British Army's staging at Portsmouth of a special parade of 6,000 personnel from all three branches of the British Armed Forces. This contrasted with the vastly larger events of past royal jubilees, in that there was no Royal Naval Fleet Review, or large scale Army Review.

The Queen's bodyguards paraded together for the first time in their respective histories, when the Honourable Corps of Gentlemen at Arms, Yeomen of the Guard and Royal Company of Archers, plus the Yeomen Warders of the Tower of London, the Military Knights of Windsor and In-Pensioners of the Royal Hospital undertook a parade at Buckingham Palace on 5 July.

The Queen also hosted a banquet for all of Europe's reigning kings and queens, one for all her incumbent Governors-General, and garden parties at both Buckingham Palace and Holyrood Palace for people born on Accession Day 1952. Around the country, street parties were organised, for which some 40,000 toolkits were distributed.

The Golden Jubilee Poetry competition was held for children aged from 7 to 18 which invited the children to submit a poem about how the United Kingdom changed over the last 50 years. The winner was invited to Buckingham Palace to receive a specially commissioned medal from the Queen. All entries were preserved for posterity in the Royal Archives at Windsor Castle.

==== Goodwill visits ====
For the Queen's goodwill visits, which commenced on 1 May, two to three days were spent in each corner of England; the Queen and the Duke first stopped in Cornwall, Devon, and Somerset before travelling to Tyne and Wear, then finally to Buckinghamshire and Berkshire. On 13 May, the couple were received in Northern Ireland, and visited such areas as County Fermanagh, Cookstown, and Omagh. Then, throughout much of mid-May, the royal couple were in London devoting much time to the promotion of the arts, attending the Chelsea Flower Show, dedicating the Queen's Gallery at Buckingham Palace, and attending a reception at the Royal Academy of Arts. The jubilee trips recommenced on 23 May with a six-day trip to Scotland; the royals first stopped in Glasgow, and then travelled on to Edinburgh, Dundee, Stornoway and Aberdeen, and, following the jubilee weekend in London, the Queen and the Duke of Edinburgh on 7 June toured West Sussex, spent three days in Wales, touring Anglesey, Llanelli, and Cardiff. The next month, the royal couple made two-day trips to the West Midlands, Yorkshire (where the Queen visited the set of the soap opera Emmerdale), and the counties of Suffolk and Norfolk, as well as undertaking a three-day goodwill trip to Liverpool and Manchester, where the Queen opened the 2002 Commonwealth Games. The Queen closed out July by touring the East Midlands, and ended her domestic tour by visiting Lancashire.

As part of her Golden Jubilee tour of the United Kingdom, the Queen visited a London Hindu temple, the Manchester Jewish Museum, an Islamic centre in Scunthorpe and a Sikh temple in Leicester, to recognise the growth of religious and cultural diversity across the country. Other members of the royal family visited a Jain temple, a Zoroastrian thanksgiving service and a Buddhist gathering during the Jubilee year.

==== Golden Jubilee Weekend ====
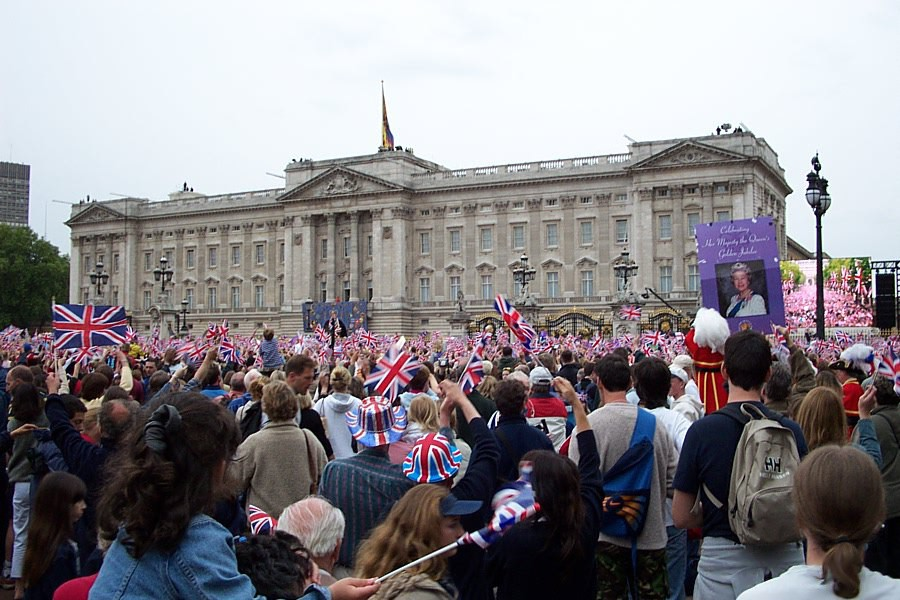
People wave their flags outside Buckingham Palace

The Golden Jubilee Weekend took place between 1 and 4 June 2002 in London, for which the Queen and the Duke of Edinburgh left Scotland on 29 May to make final preparations. On the first evening, the Saturday, the Prom at the Palace took place in the Buckingham Palace Garden and highlighted classical music; out of the two million who applied for tickets, 12,500 people were selected to attend, making the event the largest ever held on the royal property. The crowds were entertained by the BBC Symphony Orchestra and BBC Symphony Chorus, conducted by Sir Andrew Davis, and guest vocalists included Kiri Te Kanawa, Thomas Allen, Angela Gheorghiu, and Roberto Alagna. Earlier in the day, Cardiff Bay hosted performances by Europe and the UK's street theatre artists and a gala was held at Belfast City Hall.

The following day, the Queen and her husband attended a church service at St. George's Chapel, Windsor Castle, while their family were present at thanksgiving services elsewhere in the United Kingdom; the Prince of Wales and his sons, Princes William and Harry, in Swansea; the Earl and Countess of Wessex in Salisbury; and the Princess Royal in Ayr. On the same day, the Welsh National Opera gave a performance in Cardiff Bay.

After time on 3 June touring Eton and Slough and watching a parade in Windsor, Queen Elizabeth II and the Duke of Edinburgh returned to London and the former at 1:00 pm launched the nationwide BBC Music Live Festival, in which more than 200 towns and cities across the United Kingdom publicly played the Beatles song "All You Need Is Love". During the day, street parties were held around the country, and that evening, the Queen, the Duke, and other members of the immediate Royal Family, made themselves present at another concert on the grounds of Buckingham Palace; this fête, called Party at the Palace, showcased achievements in pop music over the previous 50 years, with headlining acts including Paul McCartney, Eric Clapton, Cliff Richard, and Tony Bennett. Queen guitarist Brian May commenced the event by playing his arrangement of "God Save the Queen" from the roof of the palace, and Paul McCartney concluded the night with such numbers as "While My Guitar Gently Weeps" and "Hey Jude", which were each performed before and after the Queen lit the National Beacon at the Victoria Memorial, the last in a string of 2,006 beacons to be lit in a chain throughout the world, echoing Queen Victoria's own Golden Jubilee in 1887. 12,000 guests were allowed into the concert, while an additional one million people thronged The Mall to watch and listen to the festivities on giant television screens and join in with the palace audience's singing from outside the gates of Buckingham Palace, and a further 200 million watched the televised event around the world.

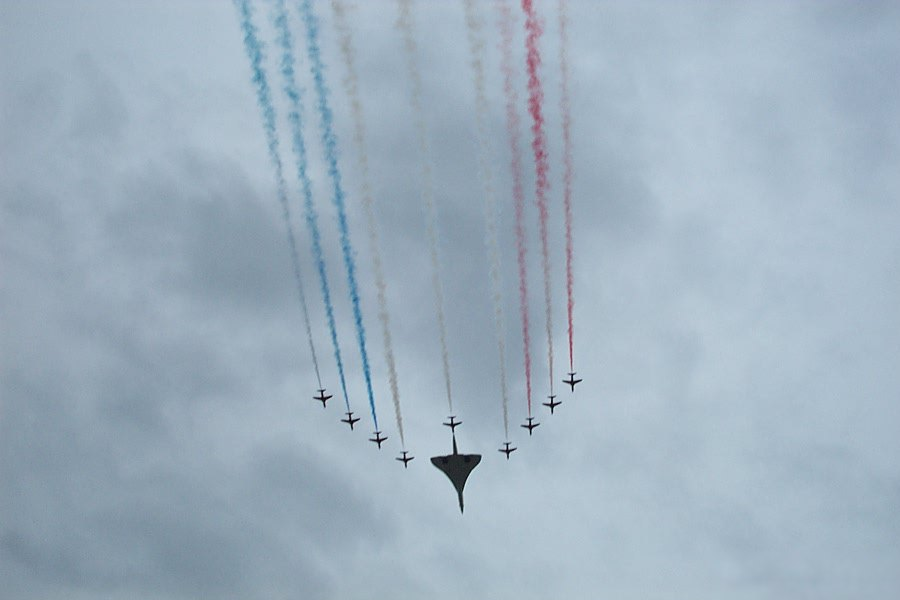
Concorde and the Red Arrows ended the flypast over Buckingham Palace on 4 June

On 4 June, the entire royal family and 2,400 guests attended a national service of thanksgiving at St Paul's Cathedral, to which the Queen rode in the Gold State Coach. The procession to the cathedral began with a 41-gun salute in Hyde Park and 700,000 people lined the streets to watch the royal family on their way to the service. The thanksgiving service was followed by lunch at the Guildhall. There the Queen addressed the crowd and expressed pride at the Commonwealth's achievements, both during her reign as queen and throughout time; Elizabeth was quoted as saying: "Gratitude, respect and pride, these words sum up how I feel about the people of this country and the Commonwealth—and what this Golden Jubilee means to me." Then the jubilee parade, which included 20,000 participants, started along The Mall in the early afternoon. Veterans, volunteers, members of the ambulance service, the Automobile Association and the British Red Cross took part in the parade. In addition to entertainers performing for the Queen, numerous floats were decorated to illustrate British life through the years of Elizabeth's reign and driven through The Mall. The parade concluded with 5,000 adults and children from the 54 member-states of the Commonwealth of Nations marching in their various national costumes before the Queen and presenting to her a "rainbow of wishes", consisting of handwritten notes from school children across the Commonwealth. In front of more than one million people, the Royal Family assembled on the balcony of the Centre Room of Buckingham Palace and watched a flypast consisting of every type of Royal Air Force aircraft in service (27 in all), Concorde, and the Red Arrows. There was only one publicly noted negative event in relation to the jubilee when approximately 40 activists, mostly drawn from the anarchist Movement Against the Monarchy, were arrested during a protest in the run-up to the Jubilee Weekend.

=== Turks and Caicos Islands ===
In the Turks and Caicos Islands, a British Overseas Territory, for the first four days of June, celebrations took place throughout the Islands, presided over by Governor Mervyn Jones. The Public Relations Department of the Tourist Board for the Jubilee Committee produced the Jubilee Souvenir Brochure, with text and images covering historical Royal Visits provided by the National Museum; only 5,000 were produced, issue number 1 being given to Queen Elizabeth II herself. The museum also provided photographs for the production of three sets of stamps, and, for the Jubilee Weekend, prepared a temporary exhibition on royal visits, with other items from the past, such as the coronation medals issued to some local residents in 1953. Other items produced to commemorate the Jubilee were a straw crown made on Middle Caicos by Loathie Harvey and Judy Geddis, two 20-crown coins, and a badge given to all school children as a memento of the historic occasion.

== Celebrations outside the Commonwealth ==
The Golden Jubilee was also marked in New York City, where the pinnacle of the Empire State Building was lit in royal purple and gold. The city's mayor, Michael Bloomberg, and officials at the British consulate said the tribute was a sign of thanks both to the Queen for having had the American national anthem played at Buckingham Palace during the Changing of the Guard on 13 September 2001 and to the British people for their support afterwards. It had been more than 10 years since the Empire State Building gave such an honour to an individual not from the United States; the most recent instance was when Nelson Mandela visited New York after his release from prison in 1990.

== Monuments and souvenirs ==
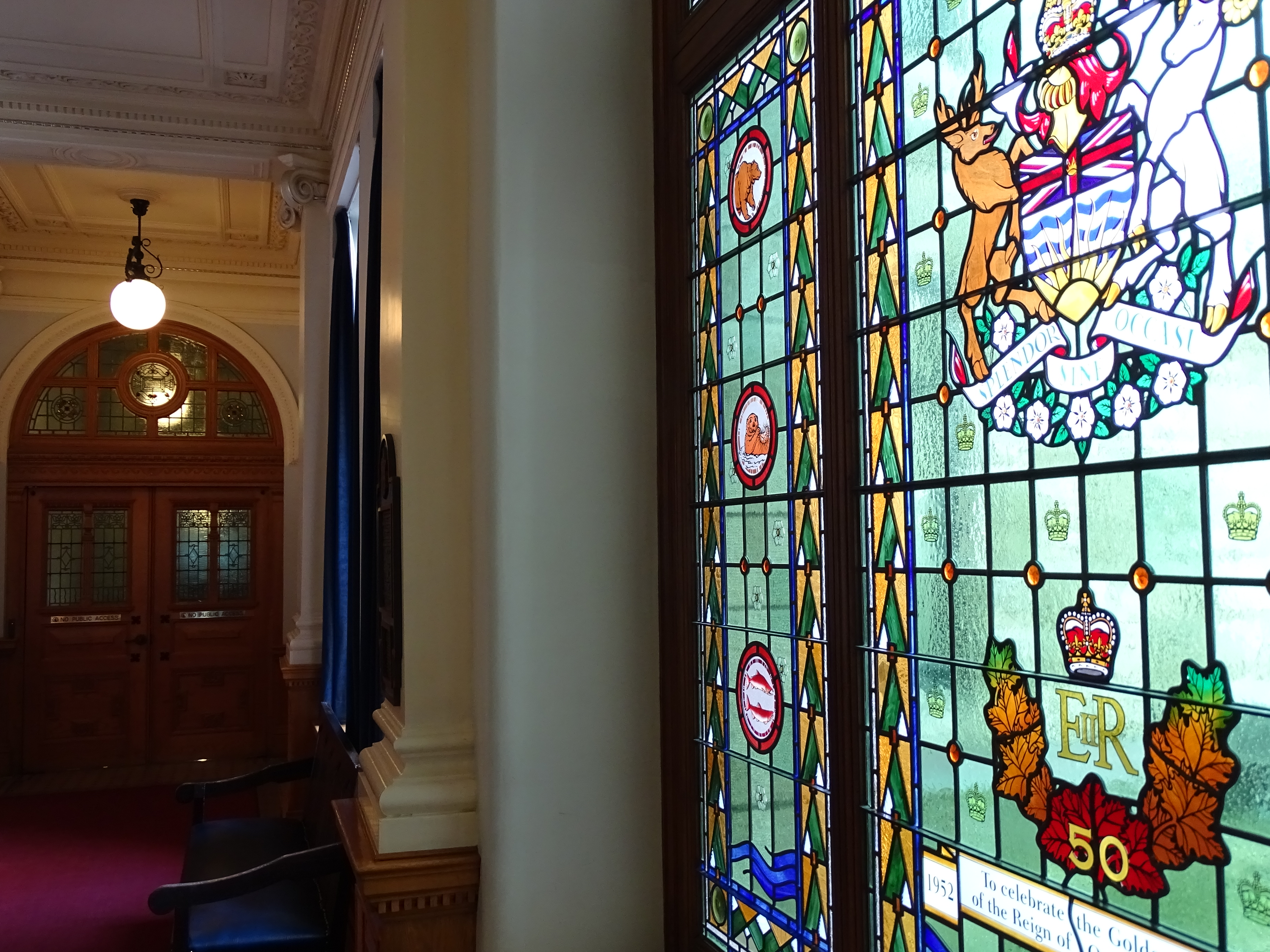
A stained glass window in Parliament Buildings, Victoria, British Columbia, Canada, commemorating the Queen's Golden Jubilee

Before, during, and after the jubilee year, souvenirs were created, monuments unveiled, and public works named in commemoration of the royal event. In Australia, Australia Post released a special stamp combining old and new images of Queen Elizabeth II, along with a booklet outlining the Queen's reign.

In Canada, the Governor-in-Council earmarked Can$250,000 as a donation in the Queen's name to the Dominion Institute's Memory Project, aimed at educating Canadian youth on the experiences and contributions of the country's veterans from the First World War through to modern peacekeeping missions. The provinces also marked the milestone; the Ontario Governor-in-Council, on the advice of his premier, approved the renaming of Dalton Digby Wildlands Provincial Park as the Queen Elizabeth II Wildlands Provincial Park and, in Saskatchewan, an equestrian statue of Queen Elizabeth II was commissioned and erected alongside the Queen Elizabeth II Gardens on the grounds of the Legislative Building. In Alberta, the Queen Elizabeth II Golden Jubilee Recognition Act established the Queen's Golden Jubilee Citizenship Medal, the Queen's Golden Jubilee Scholarship for the Visual and Performing Arts, and the Premier's Citizenship Award in Recognition of the Queen's Golden Jubilee.

A special £5 coin was released in the United Kingdom to celebrate the event, and the annual Queen's Golden Jubilee Award for volunteer service groups was founded in 2002, while private enterprises produced various ornaments and trinkets as memorabilia of the jubilee; manufacturers such as Spode created various forms of commemorative china and crystalware. At Windsor Castle, the Jubilee Gardens were opened, the first new public area to be created since 1820, and a 167 feet (51-metre) inverted roller coaster, Jubilee Odyssey, was constructed at the Fantasy Island theme park in Lincolnshire.

Cedars Park, Cheshunt, Hertfordshire had an entrance gate erected to commemorate the Jubilee. The park is of historical significance as the site of Theobalds Palace, which accommodated several royals before its destruction in the Civil War.

== See also ==
- Queen Elizabeth II Golden Jubilee Medal
- 2002 Golden Jubilee Honours
- Great British Trees
- Silver Jubilee of Elizabeth II
- Ruby Jubilee of Elizabeth II
- Diamond Jubilee of Elizabeth II
- Sapphire Jubilee of Elizabeth II
- Platinum Jubilee of Elizabeth II
- List of monarchs in Britain by length of reign
- List of jubilees of British monarchs
