= Frimley Health NHS Foundation Trust =

NHS hospital trust

- Type: NHS Foundation Trust
- Established: 1 October 2014
- Hospitals: Frimley Park Hospital; Heatherwood Hospital; Wexham Park Hospital
- Chair: Bryan Ingleby
- Chief executive: Lance McCarthy
- Website: www.fhft.nhs.uk

Frimley Health NHS Foundation Trust is an NHS Foundation Trust created on 1 October 2014 by the acquisition of Heatherwood and Wexham Park Hospitals NHS Foundation Trust by Frimley Park Hospital NHS Foundation Trust. This was the first ever take over of one NHS Foundation Trust by another. It runs Heatherwood Hospital in Ascot, Wexham Park Hospital near Slough, both in Berkshire, and Frimley Park Hospital near Camberley, Surrey.

== Background ==
The Trust serves a population of approximately 800,000, spanning Surrey, NW Hampshire, East Berkshire and South Buckinghamshire. The two acute sites are based at Frimley Park and Wexham Park Hospitals with Heatherwood Hospital serving as an elective base. The combined non-elective activity exceeds 220,000 attendances per annum through the Emergency Departments, ranking it within the top 10 for activity in England. The Trust provides a broad range of secondary care services as well as tertiary primary percutaneous coronary intervention (PPCI), hyper-acute stroke services, vascular surgery, adult cystic fibrosis care, inpatient renal dialysis and plastic surgery.

The Care Quality Commission rated the Frimley Park site as 'outstanding' in 2014, the first hospital to given this grading. Wexham Park and Heatherwood Hospitals were graded 'good' in their last inspections.

== History ==
Frimley Park Hospital NHS Foundation Trust is the former organisation responsible for operating Frimley Park Hospital - a 750-bed NHS hospital with 24-hour A&E and regional hyper acute services, in Frimley, Surrey, and eventually became Frimley Health NHS Foundation Trust.

The last chair and CEO of Frimley Park Hospital NHS FT were Sir Michael Aaronson and Sir Andrew Valentine Morris respectively.

Frimley Park Hospital NHS Trust gained NHS Foundation Trust status on 1 April 2005, one of the first NHS hospital trusts in the country.

In September 2013 it was proposed that the Trust should take over Heatherwood and Wexham Park Hospitals NHS Foundation Trust

In September 2014, the Trust was awarded an "Outstanding" rating, the first to get this award under the Care Quality Commission's revised inspection regime introduced in 2013 in response to the Francis Inquiry into failings at Mid Staffordshire Hospitals NHS Foundation Trust

The Trust became Frimley Health NHS Foundation Trust on 1 October 2014 when it acquired the neighbouring Heatherwood and Wexham Park Hospitals NHS Foundation Trust (HWPH) under a mutually agreed arrangement supported by the local healthcare community, the Department of Health and NHS England, aimed at improving standards at HWPH after it was placed into special measures by the Care Quality Commission.

== Leadership ==
The Trust is led by a Trust Board consisting of 8 executive and 9 non-executive directors. Bryan Ingleby has been the Chair since 2023. Lance McCarthy has been chief executive (CEO) since August 2024. The Board acts in a unitary fashion. In addition to the CEO, the executive team consists of the Deputy CEO, Chief Medical Officer, Chief of nursing and midwifery, Chief Financial Officer, Chief Operating Officer, Chief People Officer and Chief Strategy Officer. All are full voting members.

The Trust believes in a clinically led model of leadership, with services divided into 10 cross-site directorates, each led by a chief of service and supported by an associate director and head of nursing who act as a tri-led leadership along with leads in each of the professional allied healthcare professionals

As a foundation trust there is an elected council of governors. In May 2017 the trust decided to reduce the number of governors from 37 to 22, saying the council of governors needed to be more effective.

== Development ==
The Trust secured funding to build both a new emergency centre, as well as an upgraded maternity unit, at Wexham Park, and is building an elective centre at the Heatherwood location due to be completed in Autumn 2021. The £10 million maternity unit was opened in January 2018 and the new emergency centre was completed in Spring 2019.

At the time of the formation of the Trust, the three East Berkshire Clinical commissioning groups stated that they had been asked to provide £11m extra funding to support the trust's "integration costs" over the next few years, in addition to normal payments for activity.

In March 2015 the Department of Health agreed a package of support to the new Trust: £127.2m of public dividend capital and £59m of loan funding to support rebuilding and refurbishment of parts of the Heatherwood site. It is planned to save £8m by sharing buildings and to make £28m from selling land at Heatherwood Hospital. The merged organisation is expected to run a deficit until 2020-21 and meeting this brings the total cost of financial support for the merger to £328 million.

The Trust has been named by the Health Service Journal as one of the top hundred NHS trusts to work for in 2015. At that time it had 4948 full-time equivalent staff and a sickness absence rate of 3%. 89% of staff recommend it as a place for treatment and 77% recommended it as a place to work.

The Care Quality Commission in February 2016 said that the "remarkable" improvement in care at Wexham Park Hospital after the merger was the "most impressive" turnaround it has seen.

The Trust is part of the Frimley Health and Care integrated care system (ICS). It proposes to establish a network of 14 integrated primary and acute care hubs in Farnham, Fleet, Farnborough, Aldershot, Yateley, Surrey Heath, Bracknell, Ascot, Windsor, Maidenhead, and Slough. Each is to be a "single point of access" for social, mental and physical health care. An increase in primary care expenditure of 21% by 2021 is planned, and savings of £65 million anticipated based on workforce changes and a shared electronic care record. These require £20 million more investment than the announced funding of £47 million from the sustainability and transformation fund.

The trust planned to set up a wholly owned subsidiary company which would own all the trusts land and buildings and provide housekeeping, estates management, equipment maintenance, catering, procurement and security services. This would reduce the VAT bill and permit new staff to be employed on different terms and conditions at "competitive market rates". The proposals are opposed by Unite the Union. In March 2021 the plan was dropped.

== Performance ==
Historically the Trust has delivered key performance metrics. Like many Trusts, the 4-hour access standard has been more difficult to achieve since 2015.

Frimley Health, accepts staffing is "a concern", the trust paid locum or agency nurses, doctors and midwives for covering 41,055 shifts in 2016.

However, as of May 2018, the Trust continues to deliver both the 18-week RTT metric and the 62-day cancer standard for its patients.

== See also ==
- List of NHS trusts
- Andrew Valentine Morris
