= Battle of Reading =

Battle of Reading may refer to:

- Battle of Reading (871)
- Battle of Reading (1688)

See also

- Siege of Reading (1642-1643)
- Battle, Reading (disambiguation)
