= Tomlinscote School =

Location
- Tomlinscote Way; Frimley, Surrey, GU16 8PY; England; 51.320389°N 0.72319°W

Information
- Type: Academy
- Established: 1970
- Trust: The Prospect Trust
- Department for Education URN: 140117 Tables
- Ofsted: Reports
- Principal: Robert Major
- Staff: 160
- Gender: Coeducational
- Age: 11 to 16
- Enrolment: 1502
- Houses: Pankhurst, Attenborough, Rowling, Hawking, Mandela
- Colours: Gold and black
- Website: www.tomlinscoteschool.com

Tomlinscote School is a coeducational secondary school with academy status, located in Frimley, Surrey, England. The school previously held specialist Language College status before converting to academy status in September 2013. On 1 September 2018, Tomlinscote School joined The Prospect Trust.

== History ==
Tomlinscote was opened in 1970 as Surrey's first purpose-built comprehensive. Students enter Tomlinscote at the age of 11 years from local junior, primary and independent Preparatory feeder schools, for example, Lakeside Primary School, Ravenscote Junior School, Pirbright Primary School, Crawley Ridge Junior School or The Grove Primary School.

In March 2011 Surrey County Council proposed that Tomlinscote take over the Kings International College and that years 7, 8 and 9 be based on the Kings site and 10, 11 and Sixth Form on the Tomlinscote site. Initial meetings with parents at both schools suggested united opposition to the plans and sparked a heated internet debate. In the end, after a due diligence report, letters written by teachers, parents and councillors stating their disapproval of the plan, the Governing Body of Tomlinscote voted unanimously against authorising a merger. This left the Surrey County Council no choice but to scrap the plan.

From September 2023, the school day changed to start at 8:35 AM and finish at 3:10 PM. Students attend five lessons lasting 50 minutes each, along with one lesson lasting 55 minutes, except for Fridays where all Years finish at 2:15 PM. This reaches the mandated weekly lesson time of 32.5 hours.

In September 2018, Tomlinscote stopped taking on additional A-level students in order to focus on providing vocational courses. Ian Hylan, then principal, attributed the decision to the large number of students attending the Sixth Form College, Farnborough instead of continuing their studies at the school.

== Sports Department ==
Tomlinscote's grounds house a sports centre which was started in 1990 and has undertaken several changes of management in the past two years. The sports centre is run as a dual-use centre, with the school using it during the day for lessons, and then during the evenings, weekends and holidays it is open to the public. The sports centre has a fully equipped fitness gym, changing facilities and hires out its sports hall and outside courts to local clubs and the public.

== Language College ==
On 1 September 1996 Tomlinscote was formally awarded the status of a Language College. To attain Language College Status the school had to put together a detailed submission including the aims and targets over a three-year period. These targets were assessed against strict criteria by the Department for Education and Skills each year. The Language College submission related to aspects of the whole school curriculum as well as specific objectives in Modern Foreign Languages. A successful first three years led to a re-designation for a further three years in 1999 and the school was one of the first Language Colleges to be designated for a further four years in September 2002.

== iPad Scheme ==
The school provides iPads through two lease schemes, one three years in length, and the other two years. A new iPad scheme begins when students enter year 7 or year 10. At the beginning of each scheme, parents can place an order for an iPad using an online registration portal. iPads are used throughout the school day to assist within lessons as well as completing home learning tasks. The scheme is operated by Albion Computers who provide an insurance policy.

The school says it chose the devices due to "performance and security" as well as the "amount and quality of apps".

In 2018, Tomlinscote was awarded Apple Distinguished School status until 2021 for using "iPad and Mac products to inspire student creativity, collaboration and critical thinking".

Tomlinscote operates a system led by an E-Learning Co-ordinator, 7 Digital Champions and 34 Digital Leaders who teach each other the new skills needed to integrate technology into the classroom environment.

Additionally, the school changed their device management framework to "JAMF" (Just Another Management Framework). Year 9 started using the framework in July 2020 with their new iPads.

== Notifyd ==
Screenshot of "Notifyd" from the App Store

Tomlinscote School uses an app called "Notifyd" to send notices from staff to students. Developed by four of their pupils, they claim "it improved our communication system with students".

One of the students who created the app explained how the design "encourages short and accurate messages" to avoid the alternative system of long emails and overflowing inboxes.

Notifyd continued to play an important role in Tomlinscote's communication with students during the COVID-19 pandemic, with pupils encouraged to check it for messages daily.
