= Royal Berkshire Hospital =

Hospital in Reading

- Royal Berkshire NHS Foundation Trust
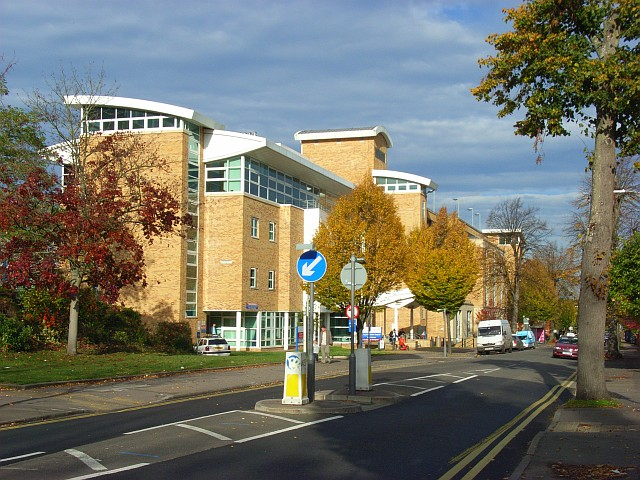
- The hospital in 2007

- Location within Reading

Geography
- Location: Reading, Berkshire, England

Organisation
- Care system: National Health Service

Services
- Emergency department: Yes
- Beds: 813

History
- Founded: 1839

Links
- Website: www.royalberkshire.nhs.uk/our-locations/royal-berkshire-hospital/

The Royal Berkshire Hospital (RBH) is an NHS hospital in the town of Reading in the English county of Berkshire. It provides acute hospital services to the residents of the western and central portions of Berkshire, and is managed by the Royal Berkshire NHS Foundation Trust.

The hospital provides approximately 813 inpatient beds (627 acute, 66 paediatric and 120 maternity), together with 204 day-beds and spaces. In doing so, it employs over 7,500 staff.

== History ==
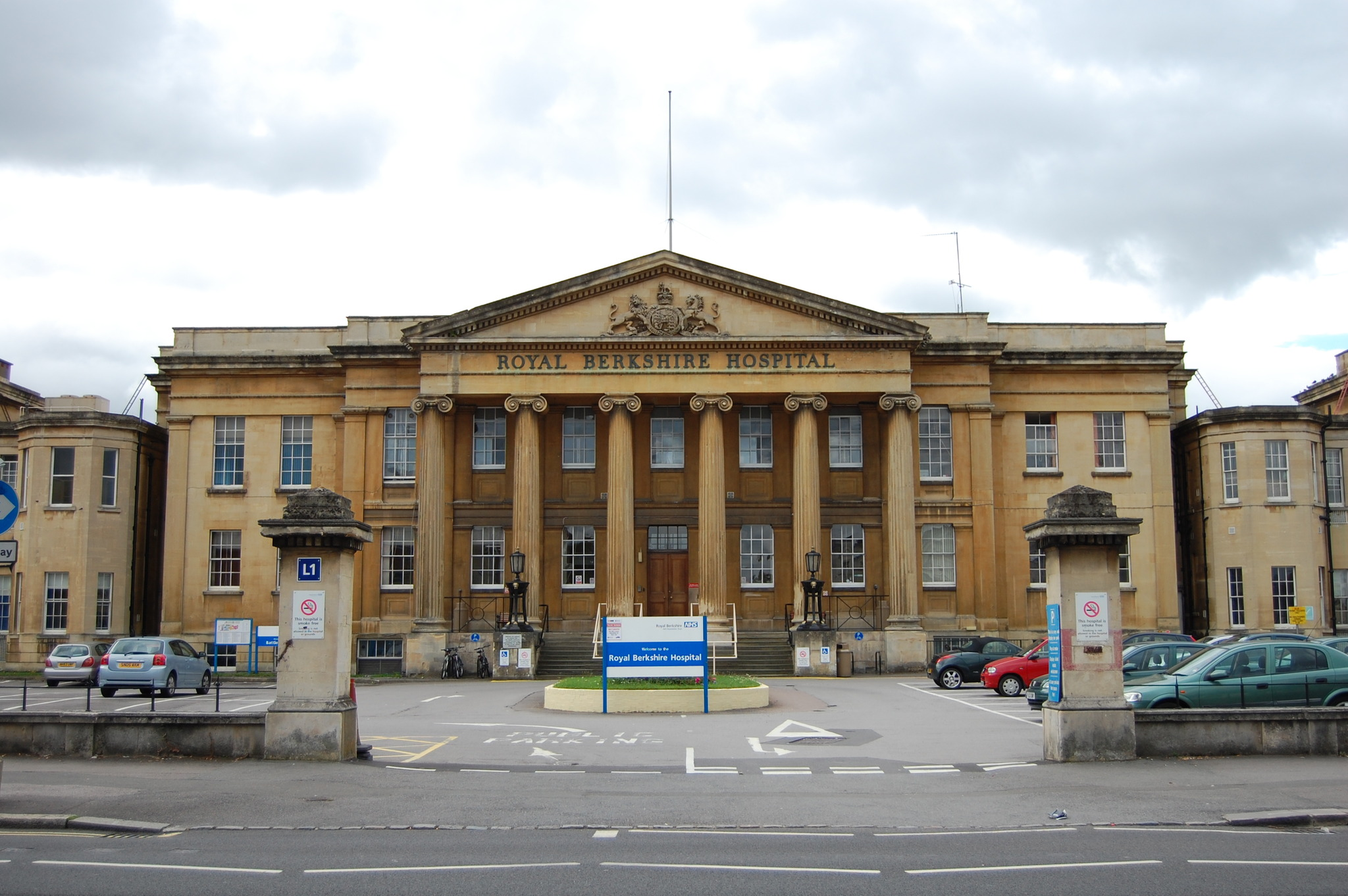
The original frontage of the Royal Berkshire Hospital

The Royal Berkshire Hospital was opened in 1839 on the London Road on land donated by Henry Addington, 1st Viscount Sidmouth, a local resident and former Prime Minister. The hospital was built by local architect and builder Henry Briant, who won the design competition. King William IV took a keen interest in the hospital before it was built; and as a consequence, his arms appear on the central pediment, although he died before the hospital opened. The first patron of the hospital was William's niece and successor, Queen Victoria.

In the 1860s, the original building was extended with east and west wings designed by Joseph Morris. In the 1880s, a new chapel was added to the rear of the main block, together with long side wings. Both chapel and side wings were also designed by Morris.

Picture tiles, designed by Alfred Drury, were installed in 1912 in the King Edward VII children's ward. The almost six foot high tiles were threatened with removal in 1996. As at 2026 they are still in place in the King Edward Ward which is used for chemotherapy treatment.

In 1993, the Royal Berkshire and Battle Hospitals NHS Trust was formed, to manage both the Royal Berkshire Hospital and Battle Hospital, the town's other general hospital. On 24 February 2006, Queen Elizabeth II, accompanied by The Duke of Edinburgh, opened the new buildings of the Royal Berkshire Hospital. This was to celebrate the completion of an eight-year project to move the Battle Hospital services onto the Royal Berkshire Hospital site. In August of the same year, the trust became an NHS Foundation Trust under the name of Royal Berkshire NHS Foundation Trust, reflecting both its new status and the closure of Battle Hospital.

In 2008, the hospital was awarded 'Excellent' for its use of resources and 'Good' for the quality of its services in the Healthcare Commission's annual health check of all the hospitals within the National Health Service. The accident and emergency department is consistently one of the most efficient in the country, with more than 99% of patients being seen and treated, admitted or discharged within four hours.

In August 2010, it was reported that the number of jobs in the hospital would be reduced by 600, out of a total of around 4,000, to achieve a saving of £60 million. In October 2013, as part of a screening process by the Care Quality Commission, based on existing data and intended for use in prioritising inspections, the Trust was put into the highest risk category.

A patient at the Royal Berkshire Hospital on 5 March 2020 was the first confirmed fatality in the UK from the COVID-19 pandemic. In August 2020, Reading’s Royal Berkshire Hospital piloted an Emergency Department for elderly and frail people.

In November 2021, the Royal Berkshire Hospital in Reading began consulting the local community about major redevelopment of the current hospital or alternatively a completely new development in a different location, to ensure that future planning and developments would cover everyone's needs.

West Berkshire Council member Biyi Oloko underwent an MRI scan in February 2024, during which hospital administration requested proof of citizenship to ascertain potential payment requirements, ultimately resulting in hospital officials apologizing for their handling of the situation.

== Buildings ==
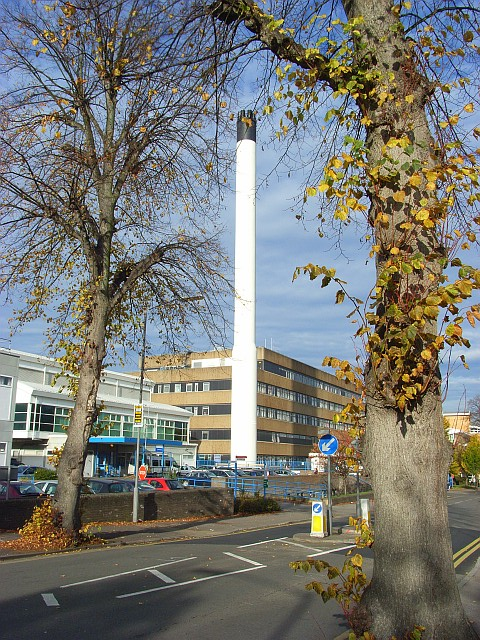
The endoscopy (white) and maternity blocks (yellow)

The hospital occupies a long thin site, running gently uphill from London Road to Addington Road, and flanked by Craven Road and Redlands Road. The buildings that house the hospital are of various ages, from the original building of 1839 to the latest ward block completed in 2015. Despite the various ages and styles of building, almost all of the hospital's departments are accessible from a single indoor pedestrian route that runs the length of the site. The original entrance on London Road still exists, but the main entrance is now situated in Craven Road, roughly at the midpoint of this route.

The original building of 1839, together with the wings added in the 1860s, are now listed grade II* by English Heritage. They are built of Bath Stone with slate roofs, and the main building comprises 2 storeys and a basement. The frontage has 11 bays, with the central 7 bays forming a projecting pedimented hexastyle portico with Ionic columns.

== Berkshire Medical Heritage Centre ==
Amongst the buildings within the hospital complex is the old laundry, built in 1881. This now houses the museum of the Berkshire Medical Heritage Centre, which contains 3,000 artefacts relating to medicine, surgery, nursing, midwifery, pharmacy and dentistry. Some of the exhibits date back to the 17th century.

== Notable staff ==
- Winifred Aldwinckle (1902–1977) MBE, RRC matron of the Royal Berkshire Hospital for nearly twenty years from 1948-1966. Aldwinckle trained at Addenbrooke's Hospital, Cambridge and served in Queen Alexandra's Imperial Military Nursing Service during the Second World War. Aldwinckle was mentioned twice in dispatches while serving with the Queen Alexandra’s Imperial Military Service.

== Notable patients ==
- In 1931, the famous fighter pilot Douglas Bader had both legs amputated in the hospital by surgeon Leonard Joyce, after an air crash at Woodley Aerodrome. The hospital features in the 1956 film Reach for the Sky, where these events are depicted.
- Catherine, Princess of Wales, was born at the hospital on 9 January 1982, as were her sister Philippa Matthews on 6 September 1983 and brother James Middleton on 15 April 1987.
- The actor George Cole, best known for playing Arthur Daley in Minder died in the hospital on 5 August 2015.
- George Harrison (1943-2001), English musician and member of The Beatles was rushed to Royal Berkshire Hospital on 30 December 1999 after receiving over 40 stab wounds in his home. The stabbing is widely considered to have been a factor in Harrison losing his battle with cancer in 2001.
- Chelsea FC goalkeeper Petr Cech was rushed to the Royal Berkshire Hospital following a serious head injury during a match against Reading in October 2006.
