= 2002 Golden Jubilee Honours =

Appointments and Promotions within the Royal Victorian Order

The list of Golden Jubilee Honours 2002 was released on 5 August 2002 and made appointments and promotions within the Royal Victorian Order to recognise contributions to the celebration of the Golden Jubilee of Elizabeth II in 2002. The Royal Victorian Order is a dynastic order of knighthood recognising distinguished personal service to the Sovereign, and remains in the personal gift of the monarch.

== Knight Grand Cross of the Royal Victorian Order (GCVO) ==
- Jeffrey Maurice Sterling, Lord Sterling of Plaistow, CBE

== Commanders of the Royal Victorian Order (CVO) ==
- Mary-Helen, Mrs. Bayne.
- Michael Vernon Lockett.
- John Anthony Simpson.

== Lieutenants of the Royal Victorian Order (LVO) ==
- Gerald Acher, CBE
- Nicholas Mark Vaughan-Barratt.
- Lieutenant Colonel Richard Hugh Walter St. George Bodington, MBE
- Alan Michael Jacobi.
- Commander Michael Messinger, QPM, Metropolitan Police Service.
- (Stuart) William Morris.
- Miss Deborah Elaine Taylor (Mrs. Pocock).
- Simon Howe Brooks-Ward.
- Robert Gerrard Williams.

== Members of the Royal Victorian Order (MVO) ==
- Brian Robert Blake, MBE
- Leigh Anthony Brooks.
- Michael William Tuke Brown.
- Richard Norton Charlesworth.
- Caroline Stephanie, Mrs. Cousins, MBE
- Miss Lorna Jill Dickinson (Mrs. Ingham).
- Mark Eliott Fisher.
- Samuel Fitzsimons.
- Lieutenant Colonel Andrew Iain Campbell Gordon.
- Jean, Mrs. Harris.
- Peter Dominic Maniura.
- Barry John Morfett.
- Timothy Miles Owen.
- Bruno Mark Peek, OBE
- Wilfred Scott.
- Gerrard Tyrrell.
- Paul Victor Walker.
- William John Weston.
- Inspector Thomas Alan Yates, Metropolitan Police Service.
