= Frimley Park Hospital =

- Frimley Health NHS Foundation Trust
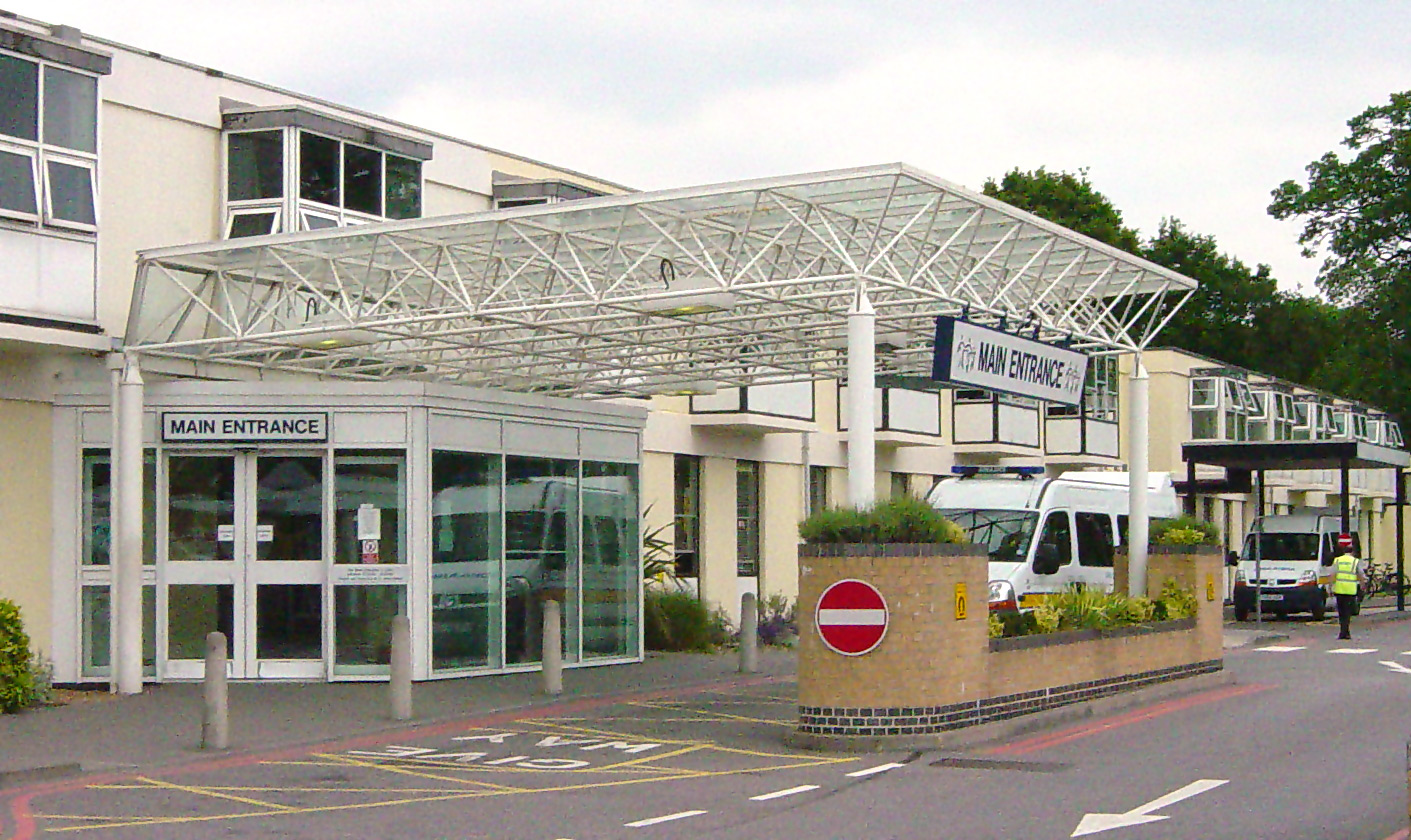
- Main entrance

- Location in Surrey

Geography
- Location: Frimley, Surrey, England
- Coordinates: 51.3196°N 0.7441°W

Organisation
- Care system: NHS England
- Type: Military, District General

Services
- Emergency department: Yes
- Beds: 725

Helipads
- Helipad: Yes

History
- Founded: 1973

Links
- Website: www.fhft.nhs.uk/your-hospitals/frimley-park

Frimley Park Hospital is a large general hospital in Frimley, Surrey. It is managed by Frimley Health NHS Foundation Trust, and houses a private wing.

== History ==
Frimley Park Hospital was opened to provide a full range of acute services to patients North East Hampshire and West Surrey in 1974. After Cambridge Military Hospital in Aldershot closed in 1996, the hospital was selected by the Ministry of Defence to host one of the Ministry of Defence Hospital Units.

The hospital was built with reinforced autoclaved aerated concrete beams which were the subject of a safety alert in 2019. In 2022 it was announced that operating theatres would be taken out of use to allow for urgent work on their roofs. This would reduce the capacity for operations by around 2,000. Emergency work would also affect its ability to admit elective patients to beds. The reinforcement works, which are temporary, would cost £8.1 million in 2022-23, and around £10 million in subsequent years. On 25 May 2023 it was announced that the hospital will be rebuilt as it contains significant amounts of reinforced autoclaved aerated concrete. The Guardian newspaper noted that a 2020 proposal to rebuild Frimley Park Hospital was not funded by HM Treasury during Rishi Sunak's term as Chancellor of the Exchequer, despite a "catastrophic" grade of risk and a warning that an incident was "likely".

== Notable births ==
Royal family:

- Lady Louise Mountbatten-Windsor (born 2003) – daughter of Prince Edward, Duke of Edinburgh and Sophie, Duchess of Edinburgh.
- James, Earl of Wessex (born 2007) – son of Prince Edward, Duke of Edinburgh and Sophie, Duchess of Edinburgh.

Other notable births:

- Jonny Wilkinson (born 1979) – Rugby Union World Cup winner
- Boo and Walt Evans (born 2018) – The twins of Chris Evans

== Performance ==
After an inspection in August 2015 the hospital was one of only three in England rated "outstanding" by the Care Quality Commission.

In 2023 the hospital paid a £39 million settlement to a young girl who lost all four limbs after staff at the hospital failed to diagnose meningitis promptly. The trust admitted its errors in failing to diagnose meningitis despite red flags for meningitis and sepsis being present when the patient was first taken to hospital.

== See also ==
- List of hospitals in England
