= Royal Berkshire NHS Foundation Trust =

NHS hospital trust

- Type: NHS foundation trust
- Established: 4 November 1992
- Headquarters: Reading, Berkshire, England
- Hospitals: Royal Berkshire Hospital; West Berkshire Community Hospital
- Chief executive: James Blythe
- Staff: 5,644 (2021/22)
- Website: www.royalberkshire.nhs.uk

The Royal Berkshire NHS Foundation Trust is an NHS foundation trust responsible for the management of the Royal Berkshire Hospital in Reading, Berkshire, as well as the Prince Charles Eye Unit and the Dialysis Unit, both in Windsor; Bracknell Healthspace, Townlands Hospital in Henley-on-Thames, and West Berkshire Community Hospital, which is between Newbury and Thatcham.

== History ==
The trust was established as the Royal Berkshire and Battle Hospitals NHS Trust on 4 November 1992, and became operational on 1 April 1993.

== Development ==
In 2008 the trust established a subsidiary company, Healthcare Facilities Management Services Ltd, to run two new health centres in Bracknell and Reading. The intention was to achieve VAT benefits, as well as pay bill savings, by recruiting new staff on less expensive non-NHS contracts. VAT benefits arise because NHS trusts can only claim VAT back on a small subset of goods and services they buy. The Value Added Tax Act 1994 provides a mechanism through which NHS trusts can qualify for refunds on contracted out services.

The trust's plans to build a pre-operative assessment block at the Reading hospital site were approved by Reading Borough Council in March 2015, although councillors complained that car parking at the site was "abominably managed".

In May 2020, the trust made an agreement with Babylon Health to use their 'Ask A&E' triage tool for a year. A longer-term partnership is under consideration.

In August 2020, Reading's Royal Berkshire Hospital piloted an Emergency Department for elderly and frail people.

== Key people ==
The trust's chief executive is James Blythe who joined the trust in May 2026.

== Performance ==
The Trust established a Hospital at Home service in 2015. Suitable patients are taken home, where a nurse will agree a care plan tailored to their condition. The average length of "stay" on the home care scheme between three and four days for each patient. It was anticipated that up to 1,600 people in West Berkshire each year would use the scheme.

In the End of Life Care Audit – Dying in Hospital carried out by the Royal College of Physicians in 2016, the Trust did well, with scores between 82% and 96% across the five indicators, while the national average was between 56% and 84%.

In January 2020, the Trust was found to fail meeting its performance of the last five years in providing A&E services to patients, with thousands of patients having to wait for more than four hours to be seen in A&E.

== Royal Berks Charity ==
The foundation's work across all its sites is supported by the Royal Berkshire NHS Foundation Trust Charity, a registered charity more commonly known as the Royal Berks Charity.

== See also ==
- List of NHS trusts
