= Heatherwood Hospital =

- Frimley Health NHS Foundation Trust
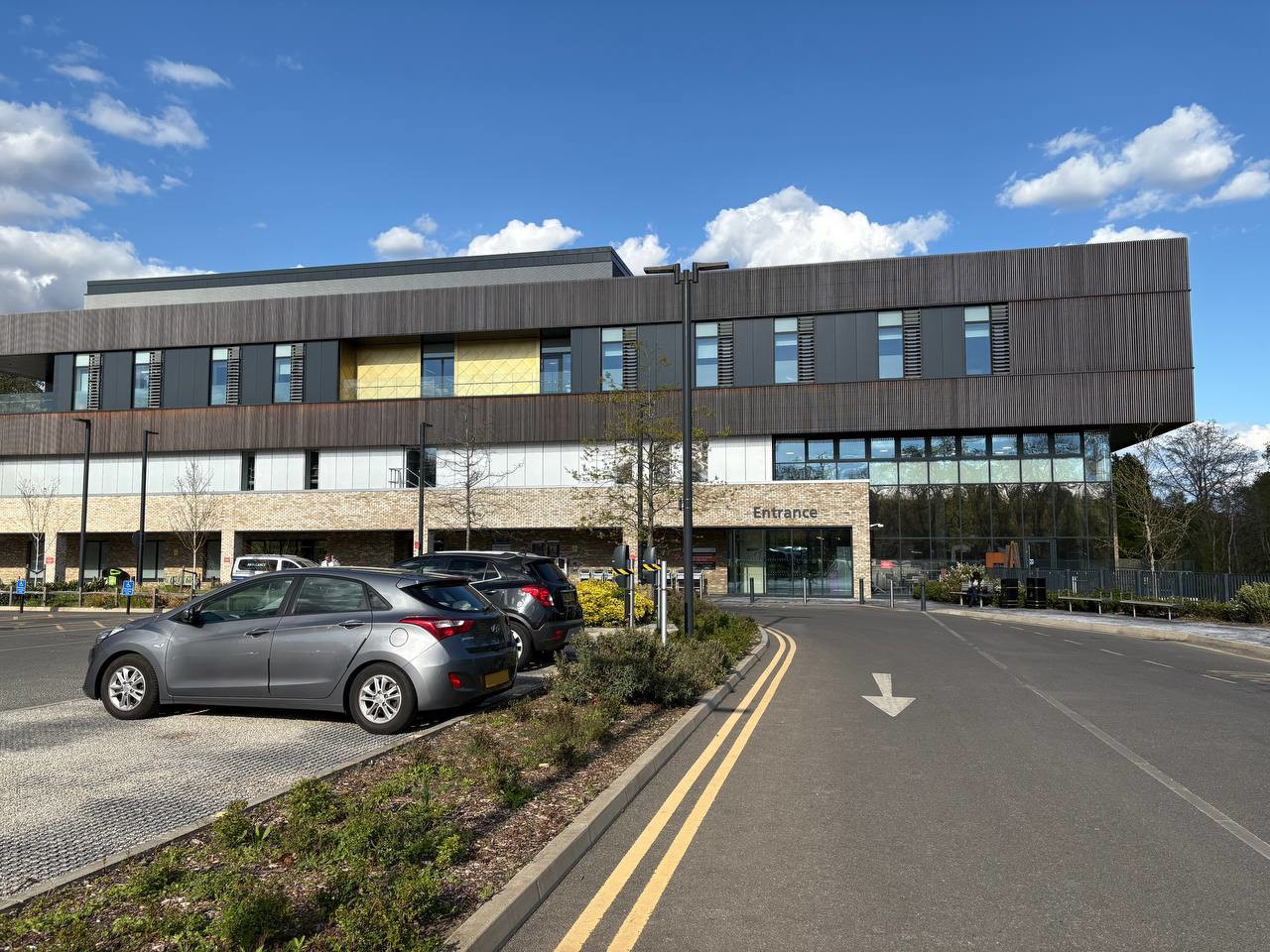
- Main entrance

- Location in Berkshire

Geography
- Location: Ascot, Berkshire
- Coordinates: 51.408413°N 0.686836°W

Organisation
- Care system: NHS

Services
- Emergency department: No

History
- Founded: 28 March 2022

Links
- Website: www.fhft.nhs.uk/locations/heatherwood-hospital

Heatherwood Hospital is an elective care hospital in Ascot, Berkshire managed by Frimley Health NHS Foundation Trust.

== History ==
=== Former hospital ===
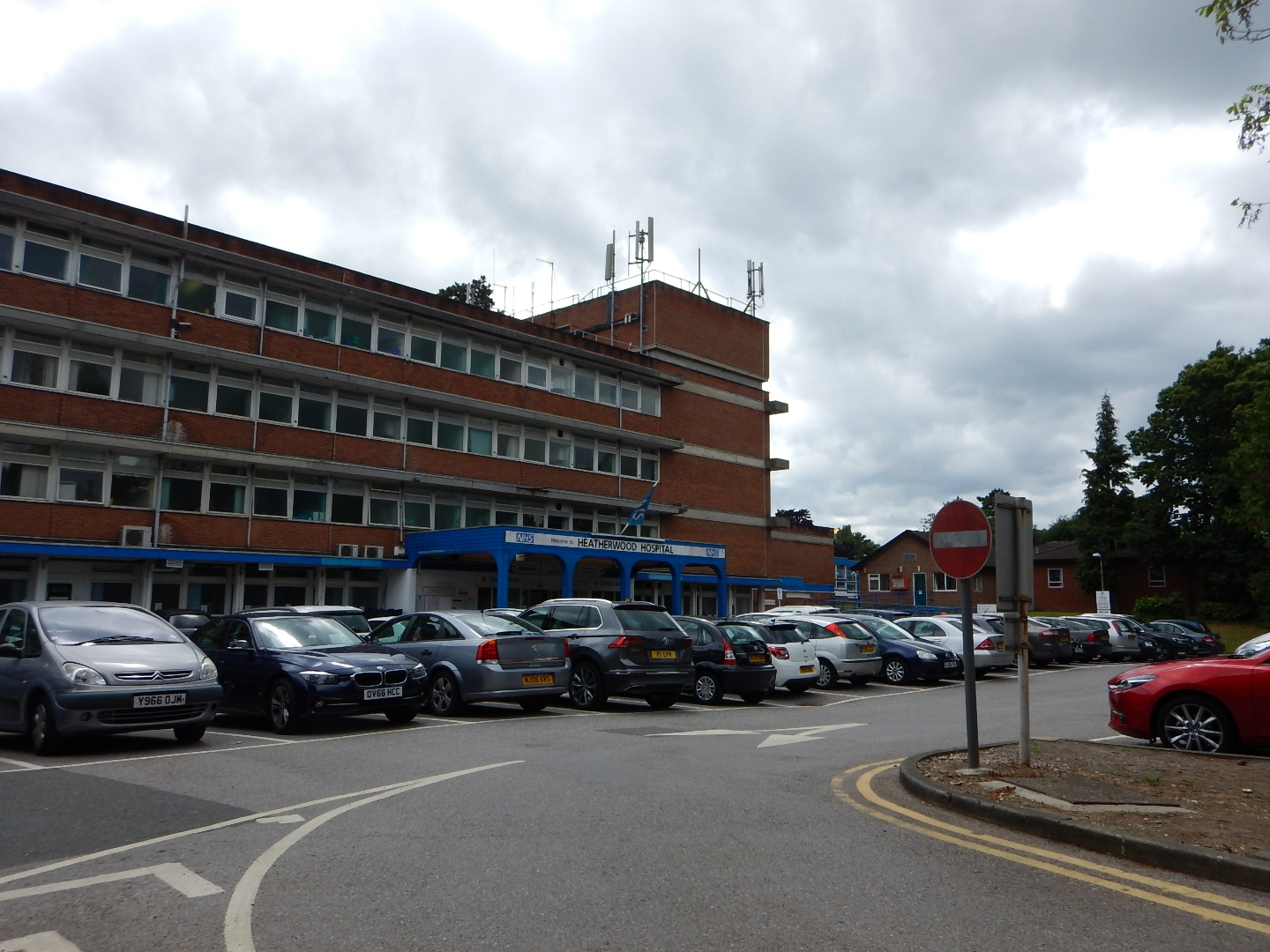
The former hospital.

The hospital is located near the site of a former hospital that has its origins in a Victorian country residence known as "Heatherfield" built in 1876, possibly for the Farrar family (whose motto 'Ferre va Ferme' appears over the front door). It was in the ownership of the Ponsonby family between 1881 and 1891, when the Hon. Ashley Ponsonby, a Justice of the Peace and cousin of Sir Henry Ponsonby, Equerry to Queen Victoria, and his family had their country seat there. (Note: On 28 January 1891, Claude Ashley Charles Ponsonby, Ashley Ponsonby's son, married Miss Haller Gross Horwitz of Baltimore in the USA at All Saints church in Ascot. Claude's brother Eustace was the best man. The church was "crowded with representatives of a number of the most aristocratic English families and was handsomely decorated with palms and lilies of the valley". After the wedding, the bride's mother Mrs Horwitz "...gave a dejeuner at Heatherfield, which was largely attended".)

By 1900 the estate was known as Heatherwood and had been acquired by Sir Thomas Lucas, Bt., the son of Thomas Lucas, one of the founders of Lucas Brothers, the builders. The estate was offered for sale at auction by Messers Chancellor and Sons in 1906, but initially failed to find a purchaser. The house and estate was eventually acquired by the United Services Fund (possibly in 1919 when the estate was again offered for sale at auction but more likely in 1920 when it was sold by private treaty by Hamptons).

The United Services Fund converted the building into a hospital for the children of ex-servicemen from the First World War. Patients were admitted from 1922 and the new hospital was officially opened by the Duke of Connaught in May 1923. The new facility specialised in the treatment of children suffering from tuberculosis and orthopaedic diseases. The hospital was officially taken over by the London County Council in 1934, and nurses received training there. The hospital joined the National Health Service in 1948 and new accident and emergency, out-patient, physiotherapy and hydrotherapy facilities were opened by the Princess Royal in 1961. A new maternity department opened in 1972 and a new mental health and elderly health unit was opened by Princess Anne in 1988.

Following cut-backs, the birth unit closed in September 2011 and the minor injuries unit closed in January 2014.

Nurses' badge

Plans to demolish the former hospital were announced in 2016. Approval for a development of 230 homes to replace the site was announced in 2022.

=== Current site ===
The present hospital first opened its doors to patients on 28 March 2022, and officially opened by the Sophie, Countess of Wessex on 19 January 2023.

A report published by the Care Quality Commission in 2024 found that in a survey of 63,573 patients in England who stayed one night or more in a hospital during November 2023, inpatients of the hospital reported the highest average score for overall patient satisfaction in England.

In 2024, the radiography team of the hospital's MRI facility, alongside the relevant team at Wexham Park Hospital who are also employed by the trust, submitted a collective grievance statement through the trade union GMB expressing concern over plans to subcontract additional MRI services to a private third party. They said it would introduce friction and an unfriendly work environment by fragmenting the workforce outside the NHS, and referred to previous attempts of clinical outsourcing as directing money to pay directors higher wages. The trust said the plans would not affect the employment arrangements of staff.

== Services ==
The hospital is dedicated to planned care (non-emergency treatment). It has 6 operating theatres, 48 inpatient beds, and 22 day-case units.
