= Frimley =

Town in Surrey, England

Coordinates: 51.3143°N 0.7387°W

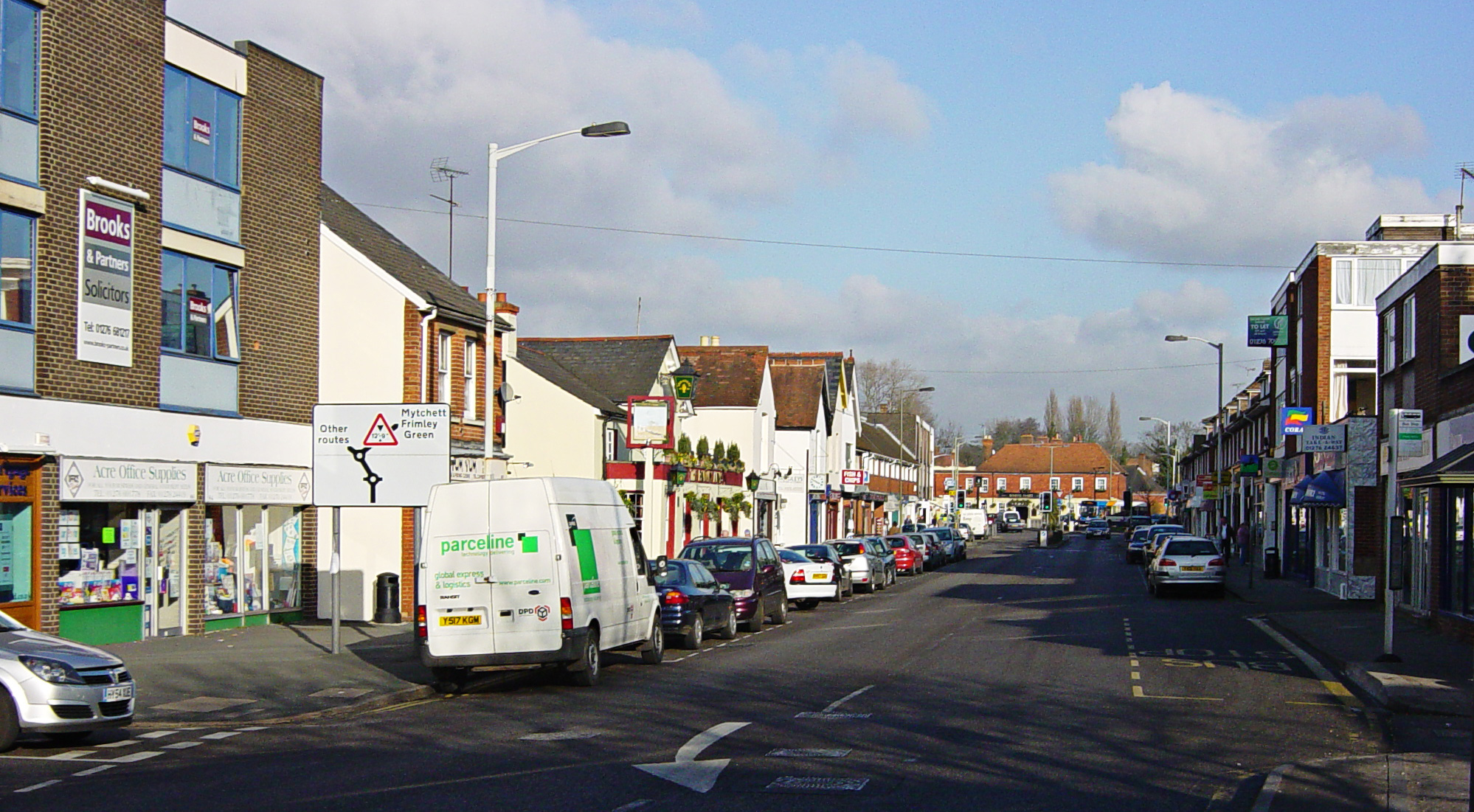
- High Street, looking east

- Location within Surrey
- Population: 19,094 (2011 census)
- OS grid reference: SU875578
- District: Surrey Heath
- Shire county: Surrey
- Region: South East
- Country: England
- Sovereign state: United Kingdom
- Post town: CAMBERLEY
- Postcode district: GU16
- Dialling code: 01276, 01252
- Police: Surrey
- Fire: Surrey
- Ambulance: South East Coast
- UK Parliament: Surrey Heath

Frimley is a town in the borough of Surrey Heath, in Surrey, England. It lies approximately 30 mi (48 km) south-west of central London. The town is of Saxon origin, although it is not listed in Domesday Book of 1086.

== History ==
Frimley shown on the map The Road from London to Southampton by John Ogilby, dated 1675

The name Frimley is derived from the Saxon name Fremma's Lea, which means "Fremma's clearing". The land was owned by Chertsey Abbey from 673 to 1537 and was a farming village. More recently, it was a coach stop on a road between London and Portsmouth and Southampton for about four hundred years. (Note: The alternative London-Southampton road passed by Chobham Common which had more highwaymen than the A30 and from West Middlesex, Buckinghamshire, Berkshire, Oxfordshire and the Midlands; this also formed a popular Portsmouth Road, linking to the most direct one from London via Guildford to Portsmouth.)

Frimley was not listed in Domesday Book of 1086, but is shown on the map as Fremely, its spelling in 933 AD.

Frimley Lunatic Asylum was opened in 1799; it catered for both male and female patients, and received four patients from Great Fosters, Egham. Magistrates visited in 1807 and ordered the proprietors to stop chaining the patients.

An 1811 inventory from Frimley Workhouse can be seen on the Surrey County Council website.

The present St. Peter's Church was built in 1826, replacing earlier buildings. The building has a balcony running around three sides of the interior. Dame Ethel Smyth once preached from the pulpit.

In 1904, the Brompton Hospital Sanatorium was established in Frimley to treat tuberculosis patients; it closed in 1985. Dr Marcus Sinclair Paterson (1870–1932) was the first medical superintendent, and he developed a system of treatment called 'graduated labour' which generated a lot of interest from other health professionals. The treatment used controlled levels of physical activity.

In 1930, Marjorie Foster became the first woman to win the Sovereign's Prize for shooting. She received £250, a gold medal and a personal telegram from the King. She was carried in a chair by the spectators while she was filmed by Pathe News. She was returned to Frimley on their fire engine and toured the village. Frimley gave her a car paid for by public subscription.

In 1931, the staff at Frimley Cottage Hospital were unable to save the life of Lieutenant Hubert Chevis, who had been admitted, along with his wife Frances, after eating poisoned partridge meat. He died of strychnine poisoning. The case remains an unsolved murder mystery.

On 2 December 1958, a Hunting-Clan Vickers Viscount 732 (registration G-ANRR) crashed on a test flight following a major overhaul. While flying at 1,000 ft (300 m) 10 minutes after takeoff from London Airport, the aircraft lost its starboard wing. This caused the aircraft to crash near the village and catch fire, killing all six occupants. Accident investigators established the reverse operation of the elevator spring tab as the probable cause. Incorrect maintenance of the spring tab mechanism and failure to notice the tab's faulty operation as a result of negligence on the part of maintenance personnel, who were responsible for inspecting the aircraft before returning it to service, involved the pilot in command in involuntary manoeuvres that overstressed the aircraft. This in turn resulted in the aircraft's right wing breaking off.

In 1959, the Cadet Training Centre at Frimley Park was formed following the 1957 publication of the Amery Report.

== Amenities ==
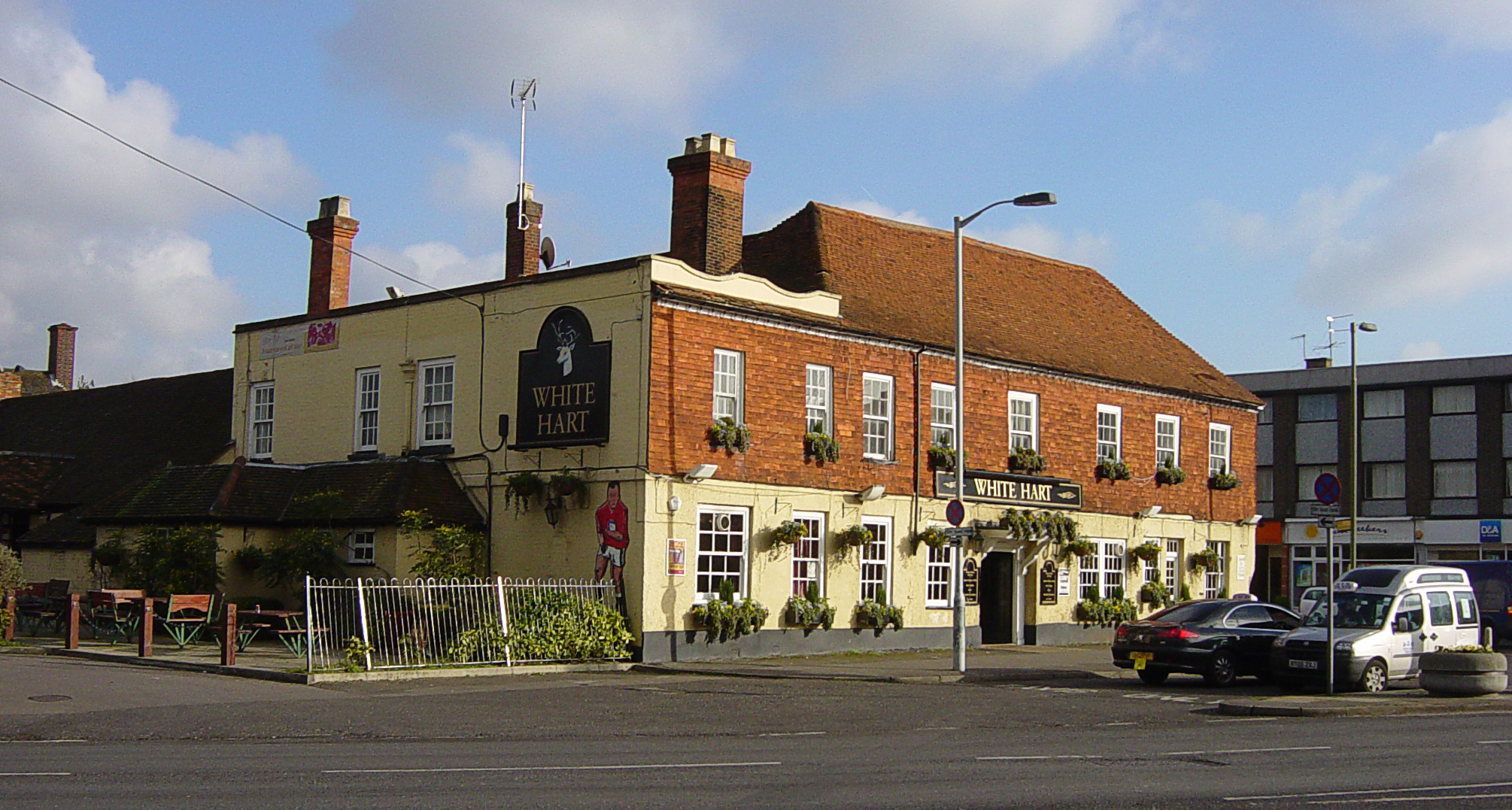
The White Hart

The main shopping street includes a branch of Waitrose and some smaller shops, several restaurants, charity shops, a post office, a number of estate agents, solicitors, opticians, betting shops and an insurance broker. There are two public houses: the Railway Arms and the White Hart.

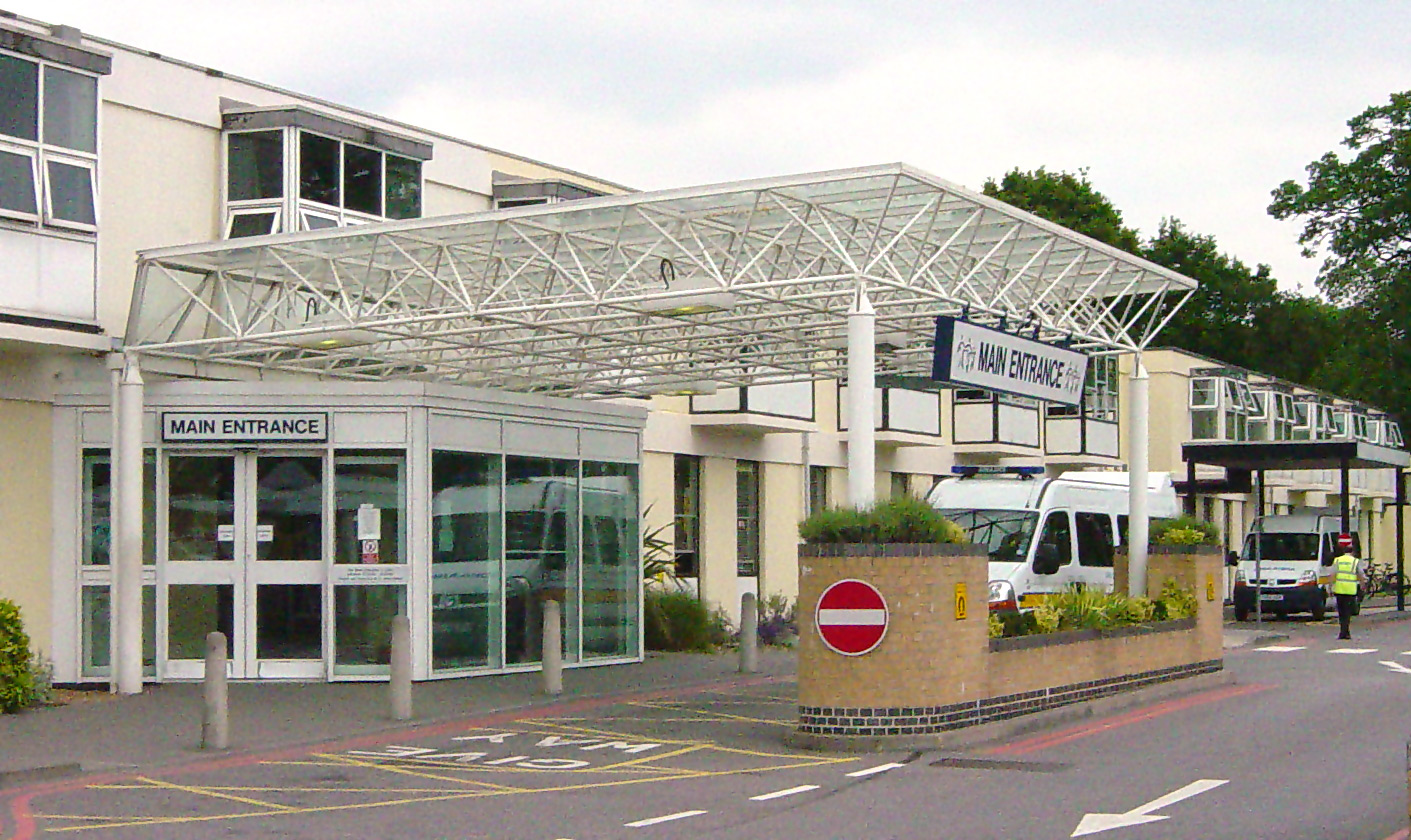
Frimley Park Hospital's main entrance

Frimley Park Hospital lies within the boundaries. One of the major employers in the town is BAE Systems, which occupies a building off Lyon Way.

Frimley Business Park is to the west on a north–south road, the A331. It has offices of the Environment Agency, Genesys Telecommunications, AMD and Novartis Pharmaceuticals.

== Demography ==
The usual number of residents in the ward, 6,178, belies the observation that this is the largest and most commercial settlement of the GU16 postcode, which also covers the southernmost, Heatherside/Parkside, Camberley and the distinct villages of Frimley Green, Mytchett and Deepcut.

=== Employment ===
The working population worked as set out below in the official industry categorisations in 2011:

Sector	% in Frimley	South East	UK
A Agriculture, Forestry and Fishing	0.1	0.7	0.8
B Mining and Quarrying	0.1	0.1	0.2
C Manufacturing	7.0	7.2	8.8
D Electricity, Gas Steam and Air Conditioning Supply	0.2	0.6	0.6
E Water Supply; Sewerage, Waste Management and Remediation Activities	0.4	0.7	0.7
F Construction	7.2	8.0	7.7
G Wholesale and Retail Trade; Repair of Motor Vehicles and Motor Cycles	14.8	15.6	15.9
H Transport and Storage	5.3	5.2	5.0
I Accommodation and Food Service Activities	4.2	5.0	5.6
J Information and Communication	6.6	5.5	4.1
K Financial and Insurance Activities	4.2	4.5	4.4
L Real Estate Activities	1.2	1.4	1.5
M Professional Scientific and Technical Activities	7.2	7.5	6.7
N Administrative and Support Service Activities	4.9	5.2	4.9
O Public Administration and Defence; Compulsory Social Security	5.1	6.0	5.9
P Education	8.1	10.1	9.9
Q Human Health and Social Work Activities	18.6	11.6	12.4
R to U (Other)	4.8	5.1	5.0

=== Nationality ===
The ward is relatively representative of the nation as a whole in terms of national identity:

% of Usual residents who stated in 2011 they had a non-British identity only	Surrey Heath	South East	England
8.2	6.6	7.1	8.3

=== Economic status ===
The proportions of those retired, unemployed and who were students in 2011 were extremely close to the regional average whereas those in the economically inactive (other) category were fewer:

Category	Frimley	Surrey Heath	South East	England
Retired	13.6	13.5	13.7	13.7
Unemployed	3.4	2.8	3.4	4.4
Full-time Student	3.3	2.9	3.3	3.4
Economically inactive: other	1.3	1.8	1.8	2.2
Economically inactive: looking after home or family	4.0	4.4	4.4	4.4

Those who replied that again there were no people in the household with English as their main language formed a proportion of the population 0.1% less than the national average. (Note: 4.3% compared to 4.4% nationally)

=== Religion ===
Category	Frimley	South East	England
Christian	63.1	59.8	49.4
None	23.3	27.7	24.7
Not Stated	8.0	7.4	7.2
Muslim	2.0	2.3	5.0
Hindu	1.8	1.1	1.5
Buddhist	1.2	0.5	0.5
Sikh	0.2	0.6	0.8
Jewish	0.05	0.2	0.5
Other	0.4	0.5	0.4

== Transport ==
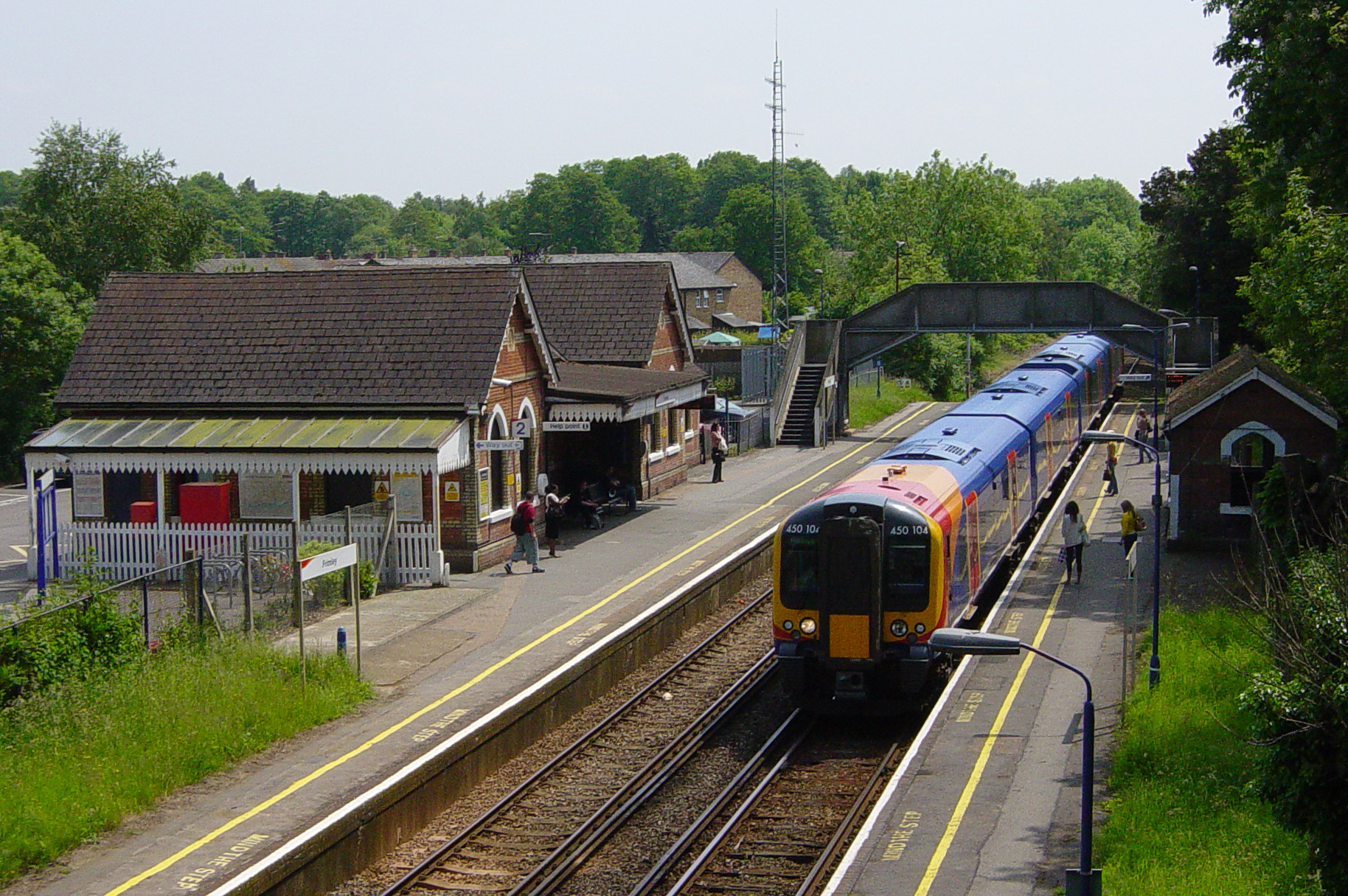
Frimley railway station

Frimley railway station is a stop on the line between Ascot and Aldershot; services are operated by South Western Railway.

Stagecoach South and White Bus Services operate local bus routes, which connect the town with Aldershot, Camberley, Farnborough, Woking and Yateley.

The town is situated close to the junction of the A325 Farnborough Road and A331 Blackwater Valley Relief Road, which provides a link to the M3 motorway at junction 4.

== Education ==
There are a number of schools in Frimley including: The Grove Primary School, Ravenscote Junior School, Tomlinscote School and St Augustine's Roman Catholic Primary School.

== Sport ==
Frimley Town Football Club was formed over 100 years ago. It runs four teams and the first team competes in the Senior Division of the Aldershot & District Football League. The club is based at Chobham Road recreation ground.

== Notable people ==
=== Births ===
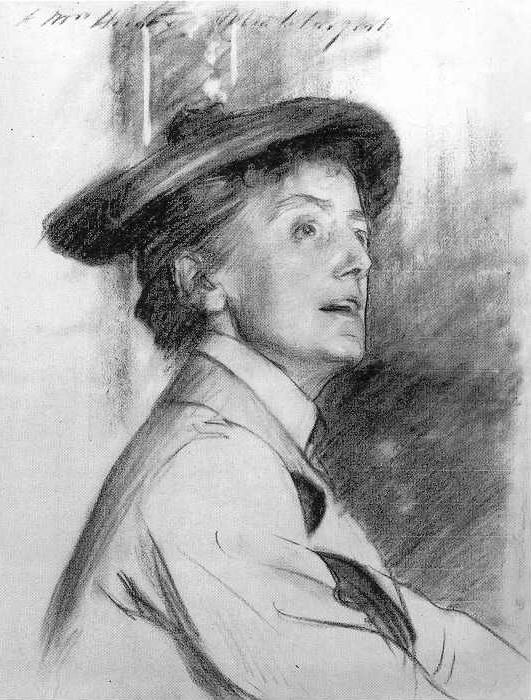
Ethel Smyth lived in the village (portrait by John Singer Sargent, 1901)

- James Cobbett, famous cricketer and considered by many as the finest all-rounder of his day, was born in Frimley on 12 January 1804.
- Jonny Wilkinson, a fly-half for England Rugby Union and one of the most famous players in international professional rugby was born in Frimley Park Hospital in 1979.
- Lady Louise Windsor, granddaughter of Elizabeth II and niece of Charles III, was born in Frimley Park Hospital in 2003.
- Earl of Wessex grandson of Elizabeth II and nephew of Charles III, was born in Frimley Park Hospital in 2007.
- Paul Darke, academic, artist and disability rights activist, was born in Frimley.
- Toby Flood was born in Frimley in 1985.
- Chris Benham (cricketer) was born in Frimley on 24 March 1983. He has played county cricket for Hampshire.
- John McFall, British Paralympic sprinter, was born on 25 April 1981 in Frimley.
- Other sportsmen born in Frimley include cricketers James Lawrell (born 1780) and Richard Ingleby Jefferson (born 1941), footballers Vic Niblett (born 1924), Matty Stevens (born 1998), Martin Kuhl (born 1965) and Danny Byrne (born 1984) and racing drivers Ben Clucas (born 1984), Ricky Collard (born 1996) and Rob Collard (born 1968).
- Garth Walford, recipient of the Victoria Cross
- Sir Harry Broadhurst, Air Chief Marshal of the Royal Air Force
- Lucy Rose, folk-musician
- Greg Bateman (born 1989), premiership rugby player for Leicester Tigers, formerly of London Welsh and Exeter Chiefs
- John Paul Wellington Furse (1904-1978) GCB, OBE, VMH, Naval Officer who became a Rear-Admiral, painter and botanical illustrator and later a plant hunter

=== Residents ===
- Daphne du Maurier wrote most of her fourth novel, Jamaica Inn, in 1935 in Frimley where her soldier husband Frederick (Boy) Browning was based.
- Dame Ethel Smyth, English composer and suffragette grew up in nearby Frimley Green and later purchased One Oak Cottage in Frimley. Her family moved to Frimley Green in 1867 when her father was given command of the Royal Artillery at Aldershot. Kobna Holdbrook-Smith grew up in Frimley with his parents and brother.

=== Deaths ===
Notable people buried in the churchyard of St. Peter's Church, Frimley include:

- John Frederick Lewis (d. 1876), a 19th-century painter
- (Francis) Bret Harte (d. 1902), the American author
- William George Cubitt (d. 1903), who won the Victoria Cross in the Indian Mutiny for saving three men's lives at the risk of his own during the retreat from Chinhut
- Charles Wellington Furse (d. 1904) a 19th-century painter
- Sir Doveton Sturdee (d. 1925) a British admiral who decisively defeated the German squadron under Graf Maximilian von Spee at the Battle of the Falkland Islands in 1914, for which he was made a baronet
- Sir Charles Melliss VC (d. 1936), First World War general
- Arthur Cocks (d.1944), first-class cricketer and the first British Army officer to be killed on D-Day
- George Edward Lodge, an illustrator of birds and an authority on falconry, died in Frimley on 5 February 1954.
- John Pennycuick (d. 1911), was a British East India Engineer who is remembered for his work in Colonial South India. He sold his personal assets to complete the construction of Mullaiperiyar Dam. Even today, many of the farmer families of the Theni and Madurai districts still keep portraits of Pennycuick and worship him as a god.

== Literary mentions ==
In one of the Just William books by Richmal Crompton, William visits an aunt in Frimley for a few days.

Charles Kingsley refers to "a series of letters on the Frimley murder" in his Alton Locke, Tailor and Poet.

There is a brief mention of Frimley in Stephen King's Nightmares & Dreamscapes in the short story Crouch End. It reads: 'He did indeed move into council housing, a two-above-the-shops in Frimley'.

In The Reminiscences of Sir Henry Hawkins (Baron Brampton), chapter 18 tells of the trial of a bricklayer who, in a prize fight on Frimley Common, unfortunately killed his opponent. He appeared in court dressed as a young clergyman and was found innocent of the manslaughter charge because of doubts over his identity.
