= Wexham Park Hospital =

- Frimley Health NHS Foundation Trust
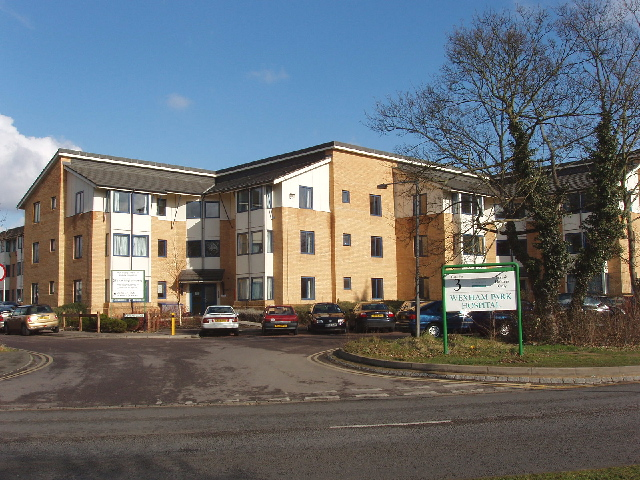
- Wexham Park Hospital

- Shown in Berkshire

Geography
- Location: Slough, Berkshire, England
- Coordinates: 51.532°N 0.576°W

Organisation
- Care system: NHS England

Services
- Emergency department: Yes

History
- Founded: 1965

Links
- Website: www.fhft.nhs.uk/your-hospitals/wexham-park

Wexham Park Hospital is a large NHS hospital in Slough, Berkshire. It has been managed by Frimley Health NHS Foundation Trust since 2014.

== History ==
The hospital was built on the site of a Victorian mansion known as Wexham Park and was completed in 1965. The design led to an award from the Royal Institute of British Architects. An expanded recovery centre was opened by Sophie Christiansen in June 2013 and a new accident and emergency department opened on 3 April 2019.

== Services ==
The hospital provides services including emergency, trauma and orthopaedic surgery, plastic and reconstructive surgery, paediatric, coronary care and maternity services. It is an associate teaching hospital for the London and Oxford postgraduate medical and dental education organisations. It receives fully qualified nationally appointed trainees who are undertaking postgraduate training in a variety of specialties.

The hospital was founded by pioneering British plastic surgeon Stewart Harrison, who had trained with plastic surgeon Harold Gillies. On opening in 1966, the plastic surgery unit rapidly became known as a major UK centre for hand surgery and had the only accredited senior registrar post in hand surgery nationally. In 1949, Harrison and Gillies had performed a pioneering operation to reconstruct the face of a patient born with a congenitally recessed maxilla. This complex operation marked the beginnings of the speciality of craniofacial surgery. Among the observers was French plastic surgeon Paul Tessier, who went on to refine the technique for the treatment of severely deformed children. Harrison, a graduate of the University of Glasgow (MB ChB 1935), was a founding member of the British Society for Surgery of the Hand (BSSH). In 1972, he served as the Society's President. In 1976 he was President of the British Association of Plastic Surgeons, now the British Association of Plastic, Reconstructive and Aesthetic Surgeons (BAPRAS)).

== Notable patient ==
Entertainer Des O'Connor, best known for hosting Today with Des and Mel, Take Your Pick and Countdown, died there aged 88 on 14 November 2020 after a fall at his home in Gerrards Cross, Buckinghamshire.

== See also ==
- Healthcare in Berkshire
- List of hospitals in England
