= Nailsworth Stream =

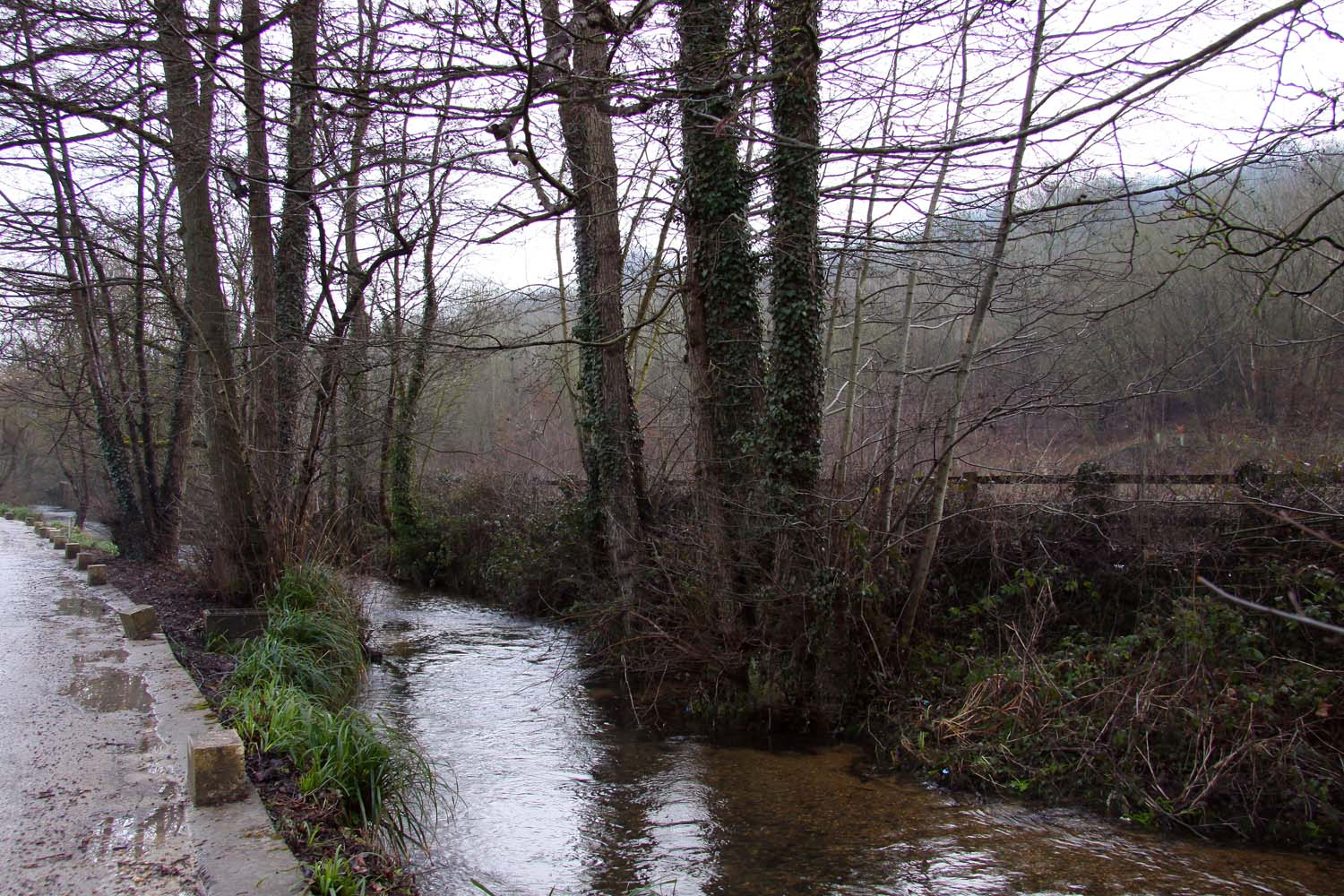
- Nailsworth Stream by Wyevale Garden Centre

- Location within Gloucestershire

Location
- Country: England
- Counties: Gloucestershire

Physical characteristics
- Source
  - location: Cherington
  - coordinates: 51.6884°N 2.1425°W
- Mouth
  - location: River Frome
  - coordinates: 51.7395°N 2.2419°W

Nailsworth Stream is a small river in Gloucestershire, England. It is a tributary of the River Frome. From its source near Cherington, it flows westwards through Avening to reach Nailsworth, where it turns towards the north, and passes through Woodchester to join the Frome at Dudbridge, a suburb of Stroud.

== Course ==
Nailsworth Stream rises as a series of springs to the north-west of Cherington. It flows to the south-west and enters Cherington Pond, a Y-shaped lake which is also fed by other springs. It continues past the hamlet of Nag's Head, and turns to the west to reach Avening. In the village, it is culverted under a building, once the site of a corn mill, and then passes under the B4014 High Street and Church Street, to be joined by another stream, flowing to the north-west from Lodgemore Pond. At the junction, it turns to the north, and passes under Woodstock Lane and back under the B4014. Soon it reaches the southern tip of Gatcombe Park, a grade II listed park and garden which was set out in the late 18th century. A sewage treatment works is located on the left bank, where the river turns to the west. Soon it enters a large L-shaped lake called Gatcombe Water, and at its western end are a number of buildings associated with Longfords Mill. The main mill building dates from the early or mid 18th century, with alterations from 1828. It has ten bays and four storeys.

A little further downstream was Iron Mills. A building dating from 1830, which was once partly used for warehousing, has been converted into two houses, while the mill house, dating from 1683, with 19th century extensions, has been converted into four houses. Next the river arrives at an industrial estate, once the site of Holcombe Mill. A tall octagonal chimney dating from the mid-19th century is the most prominent feature. It is connected by a dilapidated building to a two-storey mill building with 11 bays of similar age to the chimney.

On the eastern edge of Nailsworth are more industrial buildings, where the river is partially culverted. To the north-west of George Street was Station Corn Mill, and beyond Station Road was Egypt Mill, dating from the 18th and early 19th centuries, although medieval masonry seems to be included in the structure. The river splits into two, and there were two mill wheels, one on each stream, one of which predates 1820. The river continues as two channels, and at Watledge there are three ponds constructed between the channels. These supplied water to drive Dunkirk Mills, which has the best surviving mill buildings in Gloucestershire, and probably had the best water power of all the mills on the Nailsworth Stream. The mill was constructed in 1741 and rebuilt in 1798. The works were extended five times between 1805 and 1855.

The river is culverted beneath modern buildings, surfaces briefly to pass under Giddynap Lane, and then passes under a trading estate, formerly the site of Dyehouse Brass Works. Just downstream of that is an office building dating from the early 19th century which was formerly Merrett's Mill. The river is crossed by the A46 road. The remains of Frogmarsh Mill include an early 17th century house, which was incorporated into the mill buildings and altered in the 19th century. The river passes to the east of South and North Woodchester, where there is a huge Roman Villa site. It was discovered in 1693 and investigated in 1712, 1722 and 1793, when over 64 rooms were found. It is famous for the "Orpheus Mosaic", which was opened up seven times between 1880 and 1973 for the public to view it.

The river continues, flowing to the west of Lightpill. The site of Cotswold Mills is marked by a 17th-century mill house with three storeys and a stone roof. A little further downstream is Lightpill Mill. The present building dates from the early 19th century and has four storeys. The river is then culverted beneath a trading estate, appears in the open and is then culverted beneath housing on Dudbridge Meadow and Selsey Hill. It then runs through the car park of Sainsbury's Dudbridge supermarket, where it powered a flour mill. The building has five floors and dates from 1849. The junction with the Frome was just beyond the mill, although this appears to have been altered by the construction of the supermarket and the A419 bypass, which crosses the river below the mill. There is a second channel for the Frome on the western side of the bypass.

== History ==
The Stroud district was known for its extensive woollen industry through the 17th, 18th and early 19th centuries. In 1608 John Smyth compiled a muster roll of men who were fit enough to serve in the armed forces. They were listed according to the hundred, manor or tything in which they lived, and their occupation was recorded. Those working in the woollen industry included clothiers, weavers, fullers and dyers. For Avening, 17 workers were recorded, representing 19 per cent of the male workforce, while for Nailsworth, 25 workers represented 83 per cent of the workforce. Woollen mills obtained their power from the rivers, and between 1750 and 1820 there were at least 31 mills operational on the Nailsworth Stream and its tributaries. With so many mills on a relatively small river, those upstream had a smaller flow of water, but had access to it from early morning. Those further downstream usually had more water, but often had to wait until later in the day for it to be released by the upstream mills. Great skill was shown in the design of water wheels and the engineering works necessary to maximise the amount of power that could be extracted at each site.

Water power was gradually supplemented by steam power, but the uptake in the local woollen industry was relatively slow. The first installation of a Boulton & Watt engine at a mill on the Nailsworth Stream was for G W & P Playne of Avening, where a 14 hp (10 kW) beam engine was commissioned in 1814. They ordered a second engine in 1820, also of 14 hp (10 kW), and a 10 hp (7.5 kW) model in 1823. In many cases, water power continued to be used alongside the new engines, with Barnard & Co of Nailsworth reporting to the factory inspectors that their mills used water power for about six months of the year, and steam power for the other six months. The industry was affected by industrial unrest in 1825, with weavers going on strike throughout much of Gloucestershire, having demanded higher levels of pay. Those who did not strike were intimidated, and on 6 June a mob dragged several weavers from their houses and threw them into the stream at Nailsworth. The strikes were followed by economic uncertainty, as a number of country banks failed in December 1825, and the industry experienced deep depression. The Tetbury bank was only saved by the shrewd action of William Playne, who was in London at the time, and collected a large number of golden sovereigns. When he arrived at the bank with them, the anger of the mob demanding their money subsided, and the bank was saved. Many of the smaller mills went out of business following the run on the banks, and the woollen industry in the region went into a steady decline.

=== Milling ===
The highest mill on the river was Avening Mill, where John Baxter was making cloth in 1830. There are records dating from 1616 and 1640/41 for a Waterley Mill, which may refer to the same site. Avening Mill was owned by William Playne in 1839, although he was recorded as living in the building with two others at a later date. It had become a corn mill by 1886, when it was sold. A stone building remains at the site, with four storeys, which dates from the early 19th century.

George's Mill, the next downstream, is briefly mentioned as a cloth mill, but nothing remains of the building.

Thomas Playne bought Longfords Mill in 1759. The building has been constructed in 1705, but there was an earlier mill on the site in the mid-16th century. By 1790, there was a fulling mill, a grist mill and workshops, and after Thomas died in 1789, the enterprise was known as Martha Playne & Son. She retired in 1797, when the company became William Playne & Co. A dam was built across the main stream in 1806 to create Longfords Lake. It was 150 yards (140 m) long and flooded an area of 15 acres (6.1 ha).

Lake Mill was built in 1809, and was fed by a leat from the lake. The property was split in 1813, with William Playne running the original mill, and Peter Playne running Lake Mill. Peter had moved on to other mills in the area by 1829, and William controlled the whole site.

The Middle Mill had been constructed in 1804, and a steam engine house added in 1810. The original mill, dating from 1705, was rebuilt using the same foundations in 1828, and three steam engines were purchased in the 1820s. The first power loom was installed in 1838, when there were also 90 hand looms, of which 80 were in use. New buildings were added in 1857 and 1866, and by 1889, the site contained 36 looms and 2,000 spindles. New loom and spinning shops, constructed over the old pond because the older buildings were thought to be unsafe, were operational by 1912. Further expansion took place in 1926, 1930, 1934 and 1951. A steam engine was bought in 1904, a water turbine in the 1920s, and two diesel engines in the 1940s. The site ceased to be used for the manufacture of cloth in 1990, and most of the site has subsequently been cleared and redeveloped as housing.

Parts of Egypt Mill date back to the 14th century, with most parts built in the 16th century. It still stands today as a Grade II listed building and has been used as a restaurant, hotel and event venue since the 1980s.

Lightpill Mill was also used for pin manufacturing between 1834 and 1848. After that, it was used for cloth production until the early 1900s when it began to be used for printing as well. A plastics company took over the site in 1911, which later became Erinoid Ltd, expanding rapidly to employ more than 500 people by 1933. The firm was taken over by O. & M. Kleeman, Ltd. in 1957, which merged into Mobil Chemicals Ltd. in 1961. In 1965, it was acquired by British Petroleum, which later began producing polystyrene, and thermoplastic materials. BP employed 700 people here in the expanded complex by 1973. Now, Lightpill Mill is surrounded by a trading estate just off the A46 and is a Grade II listed building.

== Water quality ==
The Environment Agency measure the water quality of the river systems in England. Each is given an overall ecological status, which may be one of five levels: high, good, moderate, poor or bad. There are several components that are used to determine this, including biological status, which looks at the quantity and varieties of invertebrates, angiosperms and fish. Chemical status compares the concentrations of various chemicals against known safe concentrations and is rated good or fail.

The water quality of the Nailsworth Stream was as follows in 2019.

Section	Ecological Status	Chemical Status	Length	Catchment	Channel
Nailsworth Stream - source to conf R Frome	Good	Fail	8.2 miles (13.2 km)	17.30 square miles (44.8 km^{2})	

The ecological assessment of the river is rated as good quality, an improvement from its moderate status in 2016. It has achieved good quality despite a number of factors which affect fish populations, not least the number of weirs built to enable milling to take place. Like many rivers in the UK, the chemical status changed from good to fail in 2019, due to the presence of polybrominated diphenyl ethers (PBDE) and mercury compounds, neither of which had previously been included in the assessment.

== Bibliography ==
- Tann, Jennifer (2012). Wool and Water. History Press. ISBN 978-0-7524-6215-8.
