= Tara Platt =

American actress (born 1978)

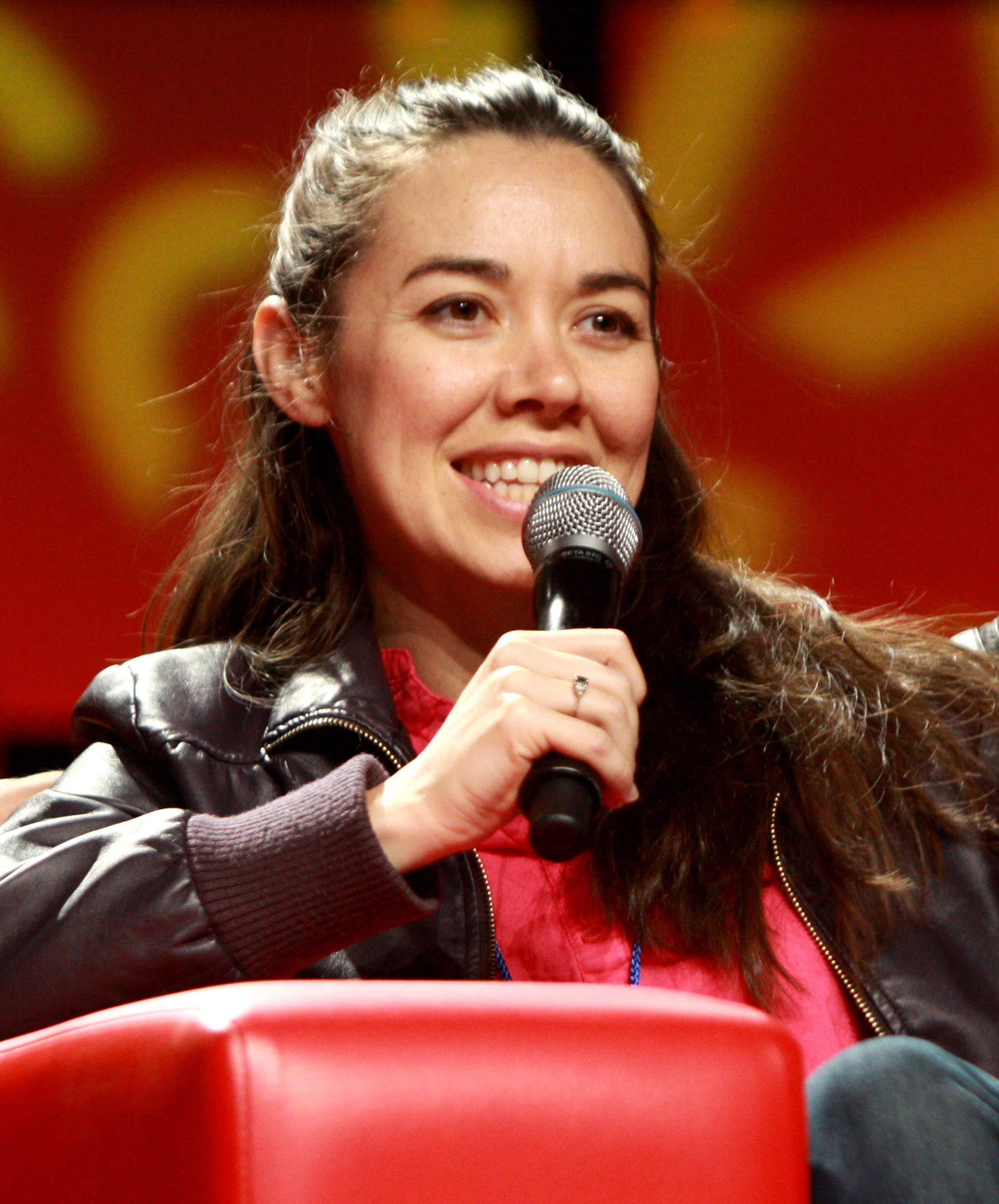
- Platt in 2013
- Born: June 18, 1978 (age 48); Fairfax, Virginia, U.S.
- Education: Rutgers University, New Brunswick (BFA)
- Occupation: Actress
- Years active: 2001–present
- Spouse: Yuri Lowenthal (m. 2001)
- Children: 1
- Website: taraplatt.com

Tara Platt (born June 18, 1978) is an American actress and author who has provided voices for dozens of English-language versions of Japanese anime films, television series and video games. Her notable roles in anime include Temari in Naruto and Reina in Rave Master. She also voices Kali Belladonna in RWBY, Mitsuru Kirijo and Elizabeth in Persona 3, Eva Heinemann in Monster, Edelgard von Hresvelg in Fire Emblem: Three Houses, Miriel & Flavia in Fire Emblem: Awakening, Anna Williams from the Tekken series, as well as characters in Mortal Kombat vs. DC Universe, Ultimate Marvel vs. Capcom 3, Saints Row: The Third, Bayonetta 2, Setsuka from Soulcalibur series, League of Legends, and Yuri Watanabe / Wraith in the Marvel's Spider-Man series by Insomniac Games.

== Early life ==
Tara Platt was born on June 18, 1978, in Fairfax, Virginia. She is of Russian-Mongolian, European, and Native American descent.

Platt moved around a lot when she was young, and her family settled in Chelsea, Michigan when she was 14. She went to Rutgers University's Mason Gross School of the Arts in New Brunswick, New Jersey, where she earned her Bachelor of Fine Arts in theatre arts in 1999. She also studied at the London Academy of Theatre. She lived in New York and worked off-Broadway, and later moved to Los Angeles.

== Career ==
On screen, Platt has appeared in television shows like Scandal, Hawaii Five-0, Castle and Revenge, as well as the feature film The Call. Platt has also performed in shows written and directed by John de Lancie. She played Juliet in Romeo and Juliet (with both the Pasadena Civic and the Toyota Youth Shakespeare Series with the Los Angeles Philharmonic); Titania in A Midsummer Night's Dream; Katherine in The Taming of the Shrew; and appeared in First Nights: Clara and Robert Schumann at the Walt Disney Concert Hall as Clara Schumann, in a role written for her by de Lancie.

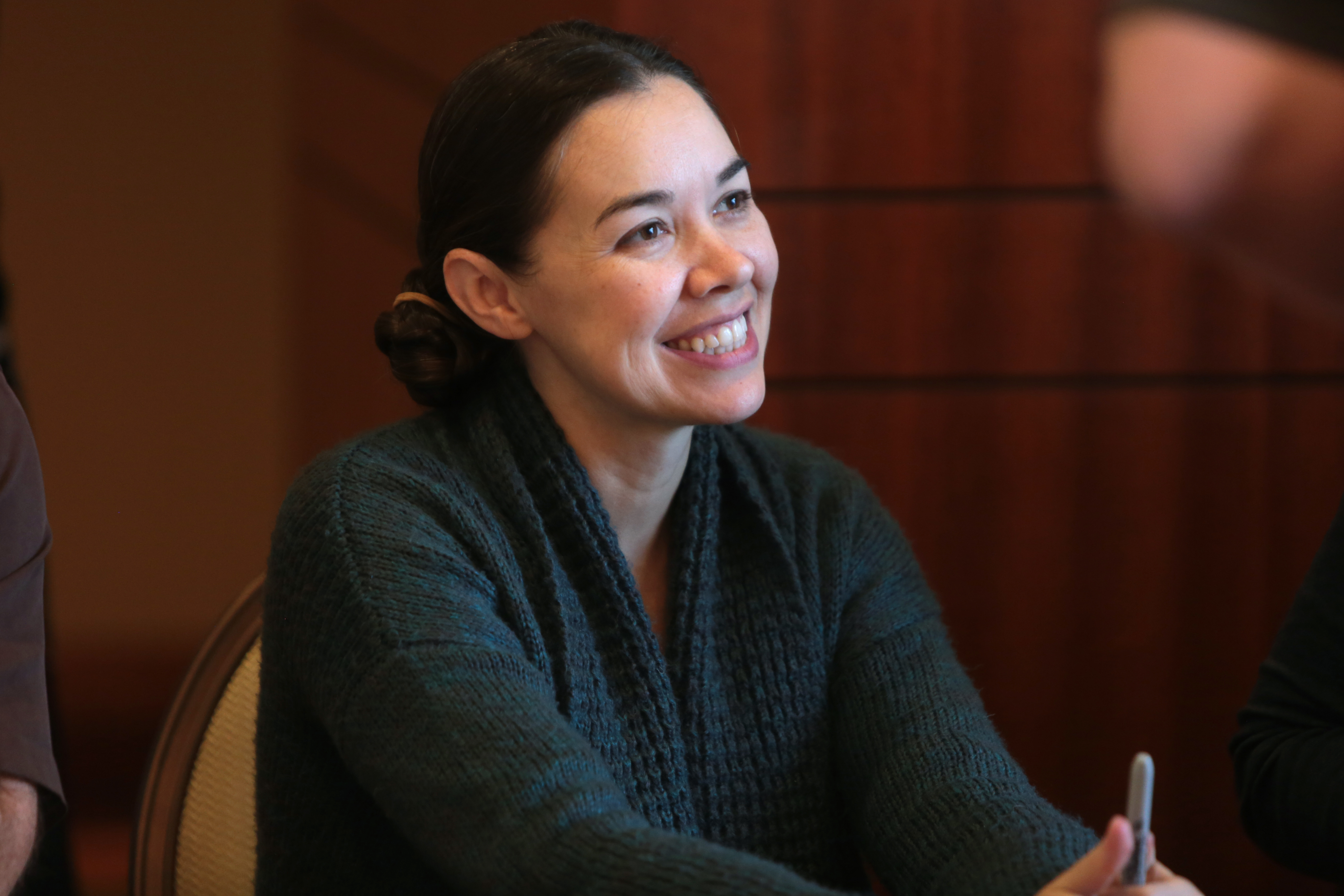
Platt speaking with fans at the 2016 Saboten Con

In 2004, Platt and husband Yuri Lowenthal founded Monkey Kingdom Productions, an independent film production company which has produced two feature films including Lowenthal's Tumbling After, and mockumentary Con Artists. They also created a live-action web-series Shelf Life about a group of superhero figurines; the series ran for four seasons on YouTube. Their comedy series Whatta Lark garnered seven IAWTV nominations and won Best Male Performer in a Comedy for lead actor Christopher Graham.

In 2018, Platt and Lowenthal were asked to give a TEDx Talk for TEDxUCSD for the May 2018 TEDx Conference: When Bubbles Burst. Their topic was Your Life Story: Using Story Structure to Navigate Crisis.

Platt and Lowenthal co-authored a book called Voice-Over Voice Actor: What It's Like Behind the Mic and follow up Voice-Over Voice Actor: The Extended Edition, which gives tips and information for aspiring voice actors. Platt also has authored several other books including kids' bedtime book Relax Your Toes, an interactive journal of a traveling Romani girl Zartana, and dystopian YA novel Prep School for Serial Killers.

== Personal life ==
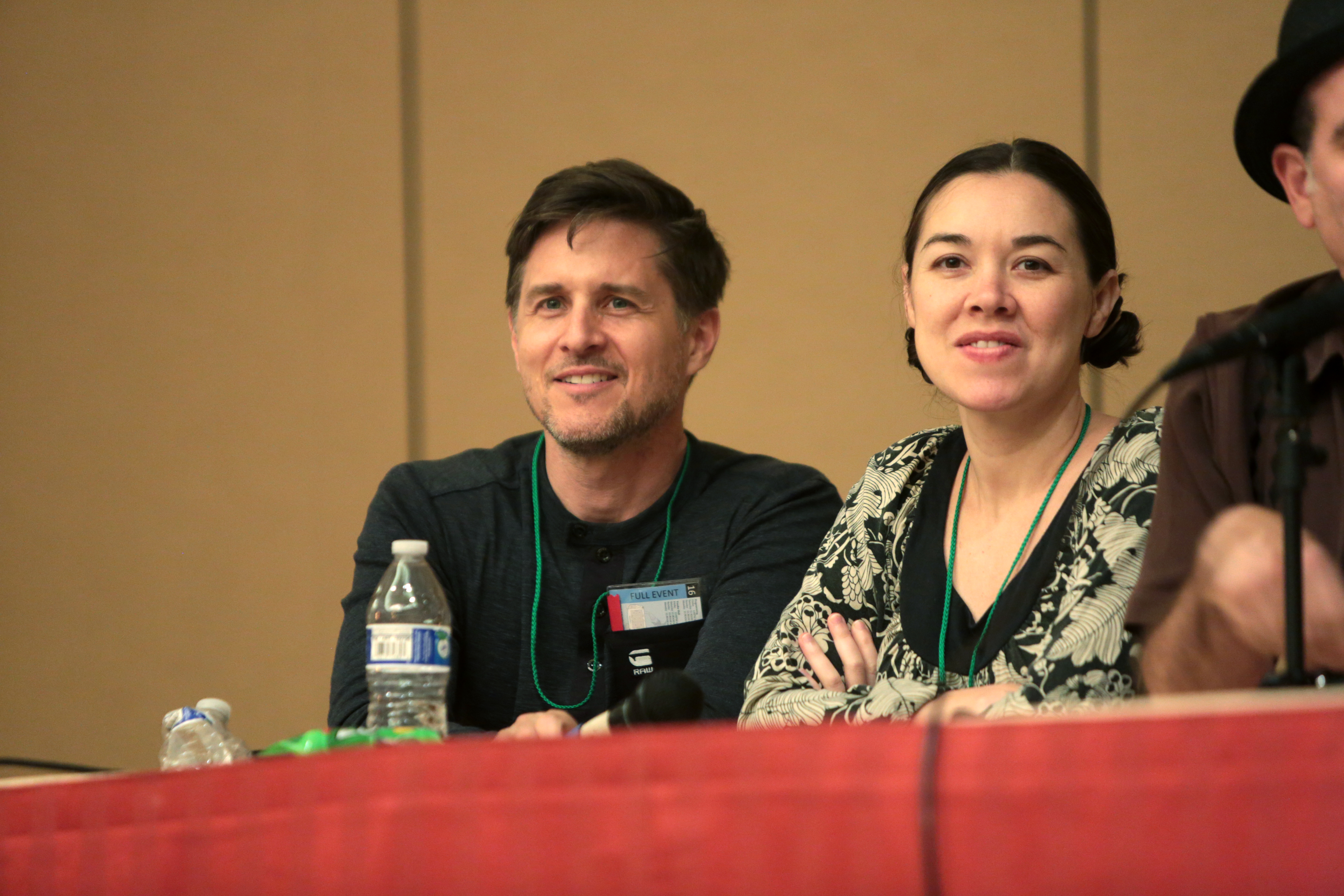
Platt with husband Yuri Lowenthal at the 2016 Saboten Con

Platt and fellow voice actor Yuri Lowenthal married in Las Vegas on New Year's Eve in 2001. They have one son.

== Filmography ==
=== Voice roles ===
==== Anime ====
List of dubbing performances in anime
Year	Series	Role	Notes	Source
2004	Marmalade Boy	Jinny Golding	as Zoe Oliver	Press
2004–05	Rave Master	Reina		CA
2005	Rumiko Takahashi Anthology	Kenta Hirooka		CA
2005	Girls Bravo	Hakana		
2005	DearS	Eiko		CA
2005	Ghost Talker's Daydream	Girl Student A	Episode: "Ghost Talker"	CA
2005	Ultra Maniac	Tama (ep17), Voodoo Doll (ep10)		CA
2006	Boys Be...	Mizuki Takano	Episode 2	
2006	Gun Sword	Marie, Marianne	Episode: "Follow the X Spot"	CA
2006	Kamichu!	Benton, others		CA
2006	Fate/stay night	Caster		Resume
2006–09	Naruto	Temari		Press
2007	Tales of Phantasia	Meryl, Sylph		CA
2007	MÄR	Queen		
2007	Tokko	Suzuka Kureha		CA
2007	Rozen Maiden Träumend	Barasuishou		
2007	Blue Dragon	Cynthia		
2008	Buso Renkin	Tokiko Tsumura		Press
2008	AIKa R-16: Virgin Mission	Risako Nagase		
2008	Strait Jacket	Filisis Moog		
2009	Ah My Buddha	Yuko Atoda		
2009–10	Monster	Eva Heinemann		
2009–10, 2013–19	Naruto: Shippuden	Temari	Character was absent in series for 2010–12	Press
2009–13	Bleach	Lisa Yadōmaru, Sode no Shirayuki		
2010–14	Mobile Suit Gundam Unicorn	Marida Cruz		Press
2011	Rozen Maiden Ouvertüre	Barasuishou		
2012–22	Tiger & Bunny	Agnes Joubert		
2013	K	Seri Awashima		
2014–19	Sailor Moon	Ikuko Tsukino, Kaolinite, others	Viz Media dub	
2015	Digimon Fusion	Mervamon		
2015	Hyperdimension Neptunia: The Animation	Vert/Green Heart	First anime role recorded at OkraTron 5000/Funimation	
2015–17	Sailor Moon Crystal	Ikuko Tsukino, Kaolinite		
2018–23	Aggretsuko	Washimi		
2018–21	Boruto: Naruto Next Generations	Temari		
2023–25	Bleach: Thousand-Year Blood War	Lisa Yadōmaru	4 episodes	
2024	Ishura	Taren	7 episodes	

==== Animation ====
List of voice performances in animation
Year	Series	Role	Notes	Source
2003	The Proud Family	Deorgeous Woman	Episode: "Crouching Trudy, Hidden Penny"	
2008	Legion of Super Heroes	Dream Girl	Episode: "In Your Dreams"	Press
2009–12	Huntik: Secrets & Seekers	Lady S, Shauna, Alisa Clairmont		
2010–12	Ben 10: Ultimate Alien	Jennifer Nocturne	2 episodes	Press
2011	Regular Show	Mom	Episode: "Terror Tales of the Park"	
2012–14	Ben 10: Omniverse	Ester, Subdora, Jennifer Nocturne, others	Recurring role	
2015	X-Ray and Vav	Woman	Episode: "Divide & Conquer"	
2016–18	RWBY	Kali Belladonna		
2018–19	DuckTales	Girl Woodchuck, Mrs. Drake	2 episodes	
2021	Dota: Dragon's Blood	Auroth, others		

==== Films ====
List of voice performances in film
Year	Title	Role	Notes	Source
2005	Digimon Frontier: Island of Lost Digimon	D'Arcmon		Resume
2008	Kite Liberator	Manatsu Mukai		
2011	Tekken: Blood Vengeance	Anna Williams		
2012	Oblivion Island: Haruka and the Magic Mirror	Vikki		
2013	Iron Man: Rise of Technovore	Sasha Hammer		
2014	Naruto Shippuden: The Movie – Blood Prison	Erimaki Sharo	Animated Short: Chūnin Exam on Fire! Naruto vs. Konohamaru!	
2015	Tiger & Bunny: The Rising	Agnes Joubert		
2023	Justice League X RWBY: Super Heroes & Huntsmen, Part One	Kali Belladonna		
2024	Pretty Guardian Sailor Moon Cosmos The Movie	Ikuko Tsukino	Parts 1 and 2	

==== Video games ====
List of voice performances in video games
Year	Title	Role	Notes	Source
2005	Rave Master	Reina	Also Special Attack Force	
2005	ObsCure	Ashley Thompson		Resume
2006	Dirge of Cerberus: Final Fantasy VII	Incidental characters		
2006	Valkyrie Profile 2: Silmeria	Hrist, Leone		
2007	Tales of the World: Radiant Mythology	Raine Sage	Uncredited (Note: The closing credits or manual lists only the Japanese voice actors.)	Resume
2007	Eternal Sonata	Claves		
2007	Warriors Orochi	Mori Ranmaru, Oichi	Uncredited	Resume
2007	Soul Nomad & the World Eaters	Juno		Resume
2007	Resident Evil: The Umbrella Chronicles	Red Queen	Uncredited	Resume
2007–present	Persona	Mitsuru Kirijo, Elizabeth	Uncredited (Note: The closing credits or manual does not list the voice actors involved.)	Resume
2007–present	Naruto video games	Temari		
2008	Tales of Symphonia: Dawn of the New World	Raine Sage	Uncredited	Resume
2008	Mortal Kombat vs. DC Universe	Wonder Woman		
2008	Star Ocean: First Departure	Mavelle Froesson		
2008–present	Soulcalibur series	Setsuka	Uncredited. Since Soulcalibur IV	Resume and Tweet
2009	League of Legends	Katarina du Couteau		Press
2009–present	Tekken series	Anna Williams	Since Tekken 6 console version.. Uncredicted dialogue only in Tekken 6 console version – Tekken 7. Fully voiced and credited as of Tekken 8.	Resume
2010	Final Fantasy XIII	Cocoon Inhabitants		
2011	Marvel vs. Capcom 3: Fate of Two Worlds/Ultimate Marvel vs. Capcom 3	Tron Bonne		Press
2011	Saints Row: The Third	Female Voice 2, Production and Character Voices		
2011–15	Hyperdimension Neptunia series	Vert/Green Heart	Uncredited, replaced by Carrie Keranen starting with Megadimension Neptunia VII	
2012	Resistance: Burning Skies	Eleanor 'Ellie' Martinez		Press
2012	Zero Escape: Virtue's Last Reward	Alice	Uncredited	Press
2012	Karateka	Mariko	2012 remake	
2013	Fire Emblem Awakening	Flavia, Miriel		
2013	Unearthed: Trail of Ibn Battuta	English Voiceover Cast		
2013	Palace Pets	Pumpkin		
2013	Killer Is Dead	Vivienne Squall, Jubilee		
2013	Grand Theft Auto V	The Local Population		
2013	Skylanders: Swap Force	Punk Shock	Grouped under Voice Talent	
2014	Drakengard 3	Zero	Uncredited	Tweet
2014	Guilty Gear Xrd	Millia Rage		
2014	Hearthstone	Valeera Sanguinar		Tweet
2014	Skylanders: Trap Team	Dreamcatcher, Punk Shock	Grouped under Voice Actors	
2014	Bayonetta 2	Glamor, Alraune, others		
2014	Sunset Overdrive			Tweet
2015	Final Fantasy XIV: A Realm Reborn	Lucia Junius	Voiced before patch 3.0 with the release of Final Fantasy XIV: Heavensward	
2015	Skylanders: SuperChargers	Punk Shock	Grouped under Voice Actors	
2015	Xenoblade Chronicles X	Female Avatar (Heroic)		
2017	Heroes of the Storm	Valeera Sanguinar		
2018	Marvel's Spider-Man	Yuri Watanabe		
2019	Fire Emblem Heroes	Edelgard		Tweet
2019	Fire Emblem: Three Houses	Edelgard		
2021	Guilty Gear -STRIVE-	Millia Rage		
2022	Fire Emblem Warriors: Three Hopes	Edelgard		
2023	Fire Emblem Engage	Edelgard	DLC	
2023	Cassette Beasts	Morgante		
2023	Marvel's Spider-Man 2	Yuri Watanabe/Wraith		
2023	American Arcadia	Kendra Tomlin, Tour Guide		
2024	Persona 3 Reload	Elizabeth		
2025	Xenoblade Chronicles X: Definitive Edition	Female Avatar (Heroic), additional voices		

==== Podcast ====
Year	Title	Role	Notes
2023	Who is No/One	Kate Harper	

=== Live-action roles ===
==== Television ====
List of live-action performances in television
Year	Series	Role	Notes	Source
2001	One Life to Live	Stewardess	Episode #1.7260	Resume
2004	Gilmore Girls	Shelly	Episode: "Afterboom"	Resume, Press
2004	Passions	Nurse #1	Episode #1.1375	Resume
2005	Charmed	The Muse		Resume, Press
2005	The Playbook	DLiteLA, Profile Girl	Episode: "Gaming and Taming Technology"	Resume
2006	Days of Our Lives	Cheryl, Manuela		Resume
2011	The Young and the Restless	Jade		Resume
2012	Castle	Janelle	Episode: "Dial M for Mayor"	Resume, Press
2012	Revenge	Becca	Episode: "Legacy"	Press
2013	Hawaii Five-0	Allie	Episode: "Hoa Pili"	Press
2013	Scandal	Navy Servicewoman	Episode: "It's Handled"	Resume
2015	The Player	Surgeon	Episode: "Downtown Odds"	Resume

==== Film ====
List of live-action performances in films
Year	Title	Role	Notes	Source
2004	Scarecrow Gone Wild	Lynn		Resume
2013	The Call	Female Trainee		Press
2013	Con Artists	Herself	Mockumentary	
2014	Topsy McGee vs. the Sky Pirates	Topsy McGee	Producer, Writer, short film	

==== Web series ====
List of live-action performances in web shows
Year	Series	Role	Notes	Source
2007	Galacticast	Bride of RoboJew, Son		Resume
2011–13	Shelf Life	Hero Lass	Creator, producer	
2014–present	Up, Up & Away	Self	Creator, producer	
2018–19	Whatta Lark	Megan Revere	Creator, producer	
2012; 2015	Tabletop	Guest	Episodes: "Castle Panic" and "Kingdom Builder"	

== Books ==
- Lowenthal, Yuri; Platt, Tara (2010). Voice-Over Voice Actor: What It's Like Behind the Mic. Bug Bot Press. 259pp. ISBN 978-0-9840740-0-6. OCLC 429727108.
  - Lowenthal, Yuri; Platt, Tara (2018). Voice-Over Voice Actor: The Extended Edition. Bug Bot Press. 335pp. ISBN 978-0-9840740-5-1. LCCN 2017954792.
- Platt, Tara (2015). Zartana. Bug Bot Press. pp. 52pp. ISBN 978-0-9840740-3-7.
- Platt, Tara (2015). Relax Your Toes. Bug Bot Press. pp. 32pp. ISBN 978-0-9840740-4-4.
- Platt, Tara (2022). Prep School for Serial Killers. Bug Bot Press. pp. 330pp. ISBN 978-0-9840740-7-5.
