= Peter Phillips =

British businessman (born 1977)

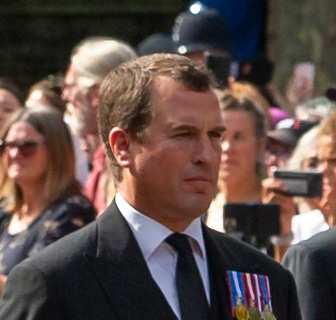
- Phillips in 2022
- Born: 15 November 1977 (age 49); St Mary's Hospital, London, England
- Education: University of Exeter
- Spouses: Autumn Kelly (m. 2008; div. 2021); Harriet Sperling (m. 2026)
- Children: 2
- Parents: Anne, Princess Royal; Mark Phillips

Peter Mark Andrew Phillips (born 15 November 1977) is a British businessman and member of the British royal family. He is the son of Anne, Princess Royal, and Mark Phillips, and a nephew of King Charles III. At his birth, during the reign of his maternal grandmother Queen Elizabeth II, Phillips was fifth in the line of succession to the British throne; as of 2026, he is 20th.

Phillips attended the University of Exeter and later worked for Jaguar Racing. He is managing director of SEL UK, a boutique sports management company. In 2008, he married Canadian management consultant Autumn Kelly at St George's Chapel, Windsor Castle; they have two children. They separated in 2019 and divorced in 2021. He married for a second time, to Harriet Sperling, in 2026.

== Early life and education ==
Peter Mark Andrew Phillips was born at 10:46 am on 15 November 1977 at St Mary's Hospital, London, the eldest child of Princess Anne and Mark Phillips, and the first grandchild of Queen Elizabeth II and Prince Philip, Duke of Edinburgh. At the time of his birth, there was a 41-gun salute from the Tower of London. He was baptised on 22 December by the Archbishop of Canterbury Donald Coggan in the Music Room of Buckingham Palace. His godparents were his maternal uncle, Prince Charles; Geoffrey Tiarks; Captain Hamish Lochore; Lady Cecil Cameron of Lochiel, and Jane Holderness-Roddam.

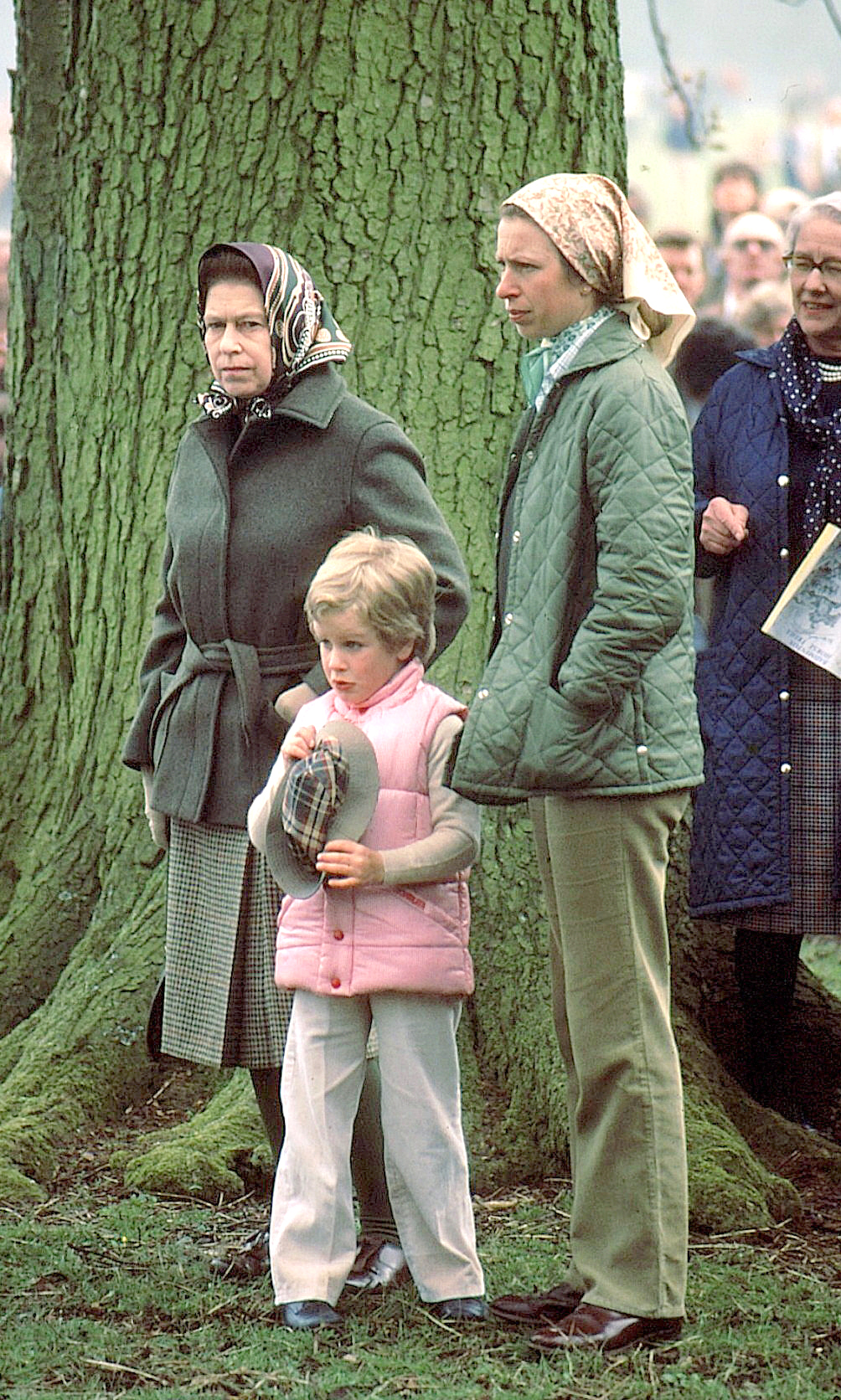
Phillips with his mother and grandmother at the Badminton Horse Trials in 1983

Phillips was fifth in line to the throne at birth and remained so until the birth of his cousin William, Prince of Wales in 1982. His parents were said to have refused offers from his grandmother Queen Elizabeth II that would have led to his being born in the peerage. Phillips was the first legitimate grandchild of a monarch in more than 500 years to be born without a title or courtesy title. (Note: Before him the last grandchildren born without any title or style were the children of Cecily of York, the daughter of King Edward IV of England.) Phillips has a younger sister, Zara Tindall (née Phillips; born 1981), and two younger half-sisters, Felicity Wade (née Tonkin; born 1985), the daughter of Mark Phillips and his former mistress Heather Tonkin; and Stephanie Phillips (born 1997), the daughter from his father's second marriage to Sandy Pflueger.

Phillips went to Port Regis Prep School in Shaftesbury, Dorset, before following some of his family by attending Gordonstoun School in Moray, Scotland. Whilst at Gordonstoun, he was chosen to be head boy. During his gap year, he went to Sydney, Australia and worked for Sports Entertainment Limited (SEL), a company to which he would later return; he also worked for Jackie Stewart's Formula One racing team during that time. Phillips represented Scotland at rugby union at youth and junior level in the mid-1990s.

He attended the University of Exeter and graduated with a degree in Sports Science. He played for the Exeter University rugby league team.

== Career ==
After his graduation in 2000, Phillips worked for Jaguar as corporate hospitality manager and then for Williams racing team, where he was sponsorship accounts manager. He left Williams in September 2005, for a job as a manager at the Royal Bank of Scotland in Edinburgh. In March 2012, he left RBS to take on a role as managing director at SEL UK.

In August 2012, he was guest of honour at the Rugby league Challenge Cup Final between Warrington Wolves and Leeds Rhinos at Wembley.

In the year leading up to June 2016, Phillips was responsible for organising the "Patron's Lunch", in celebration of the Queen's 90th birthday. It included a parade down The Mall and a hamper picnic for 10,000 guests.

In January 2020, Phillips appeared in an advertisement for Chinese company Bright Food. In the video, he uses his status as a "British royal family member" to promote the company's milk, while surrounded by luxury.

== Royal funeral participation ==
On 17 September 2022, during the period of official mourning for Queen Elizabeth II, Phillips joined his sister and six cousins to mount a 15-minute vigil around the coffin of their grandmother as it lay in state at Westminster Hall. On 19 September 2022, he joined the Queen's children and other senior members of the royal family in walking behind the cortege in the state funeral procession.

== Personal life ==
=== Relationships ===
Phillips dated Elizabeth Iorio, a cod liver oil heiress from the United States, for two years. Later, he had a four-month relationship with Tara Swain, a flight attendant.

After his divorce from Autumn Kelly, Phillips began a relationship with Lindsay Wallace in 2021, with whom he made his official debut as a couple at the Epsom Derby in June 2022. The two ended their relationship in 2024.

=== Marriages ===
==== Autumn Kelly ====
In 2003, Phillips met Autumn Kelly, a Canadian management consultant, at the Formula 1 Canadian Grand Prix in Montreal. The couple later cohabited at a cottage on Gatcombe Park and their engagement was announced on 28 July 2007. (Note: As required by the Royal Marriages Act 1772, wherein descendants of George II have to seek permission from the sovereign to marry, Phillips asked for permission, and The Queen gave her consent to the marriage in a meeting of her Privy Council on 9 April 2008.)

Kelly, who was raised in the Catholic Church, was received into the Church of England before her marriage. Had she remained Roman Catholic at the time of the marriage, Phillips would have lost his place in the line of the succession to the throne due to since-repealed terms of the Act of Settlement 1701. Shortly before their wedding, the couple were interviewed and photographed by Hello! magazine, and were reported to have been paid £500,000, resulting in some concern in royal circles. They married on 17 May 2008 at St George's Chapel in Windsor Castle in a service conducted by David Conner, the Dean of Windsor. The couple resided in Hong Kong after Phillips changed positions within the Royal Bank of Scotland and became head of its sponsorships activities in the region.

Their first child, and the Queen's first great-grandchild, Savannah Anne Kathleen, was born on 29 December 2010 at Gloucestershire Royal Hospital. The Queen was present for the baby's baptism, which took place on 23 April 2011 at Church of the Holy Cross in Avening, Gloucestershire, near Gatcombe Park, the home of Phillips' mother. Savannah was born 12th in the line of succession and is now 21st. On 29 March 2012, the couple's second daughter, Isla Elizabeth, was born at Gloucestershire Royal Hospital. She was born 13th in the line of succession and is now 22nd.

On 11 February 2020, Phillips and Kelly confirmed that they had separated in 2019 and announced they were planning to divorce. The divorce was settled on 14 June 2021.

==== Harriet Sperling ====
By June 2024, Phillips had introduced his partner, NHS paediatric nurse and freelance writer Harriet Eleanor Sperling (née Sanders; born 1980), to King Charles III and Queen Camilla. They had made their public debut as a couple at the Badminton Horse Trials in May. Sperling has a daughter from a previous marriage. Their engagement was announced on 1 August 2025, and they were married on 6 June 2026 in a private ceremony at All Saints Church, Kemble.

According to the BBC, Sperling is a distant relation of Prince Richard, Duke of Gloucester through her father Rupert Sanders (1946–2023). She is also related to the Courage family of brewers who were Lords of the Manor of Edgcote from the 1920s until 2005. Sperling's paternal great-grandparents were the cricketer Herman de Zoete, scion of the De Zoete stockbroking dynasty, and Dorothy Courage who is referenced in Burke's Landed Gentry.

== Honours ==
- 6 February 2002: Recipient of the Queen Elizabeth II Golden Jubilee Medal
- 6 February 2012: Recipient of the Queen Elizabeth II Diamond Jubilee Medal
- 6 February 2022: Recipient of the Queen Elizabeth II Platinum Jubilee Medal
- 6 May 2023: Recipient of the King Charles III Coronation Medal

== Arms ==
Coat of arms of Peter Phillips
Notes These arms were granted to Peter William Garside Phillips, the father of Mark Phillips and grandfather of Peter Mark Andrew Phillips, in October 1973. Mark used these arms differenced with a three-point label, and the younger Peter with a five-point label, until Mark inherited the plain arms in 1998. Coronet Phillips is entitled to use the coronet of a female-line grandchild of the sovereign. Crest On a Wreath of the colours, a spur rowed upward or, winged argent, enclosing a lozenge encharged with a label gules. Escutcheon Per chevron azure and Or, in chief a horse courant argent, and in base a sprig of forget-me-not flowers, slipped and leaved proper. Motto Pro rege et patria (For king and country).

Peter Phillips Born: 15 November 1977
Lines of succession
Preceded by The Princess Royal	Line of succession to the British throne 20th in line	Succeeded by Savannah Phillips
Orders of precedence in the United Kingdom
Preceded by Earl of Wessex	Gentlemen; Mr Peter Phillips	Succeeded by The Duke of Gloucester
