= Naked Conversations =

2006 book by Robert Scoble and Shel Israel

Naked Conversations: How Blogs are Changing the Way Businesses Talk with Customers
- English edition cover
- Author: Robert Scoble, Shel Israel
- Language: English
- Subject: Business communication, Blogging
- Publisher: John Wiley and Sons
- Publication date: 2006
- Publication place: United States
- Media type: Print (paperback)
- ISBN: 978-0-471-74719-2
- OCLC: 61757953
- Dewey Decimal: 659.2 22
- LC Class: TK5105.8884 .S26 2006

Naked Conversations: How Blogs Are Changing the Way Businesses Talk with Customers (ISBN 978-0-471-74719-2), is a book written by Robert Scoble and Shel Israel, published in 2006 by John Wiley & Sons. The book is about how blogs, bloggers and the blogosphere is changing how businesses communicate with their consumers and other stakeholders. The authors discuss more than 50 case studies of companies and business leaders, some that have been helped and hurt by their interactions with bloggers and encourages businesses about the best and most successful ways of blogging.
