= St. Thomas High School (Pointe-Claire, Quebec) =

Saint Thomas High School
- École secondaire Saint-Thomas

Location
- 111 Broadview Avenue, Pointe-Claire, Quebec, H9R 3Z3; Canada; 45°27′23″N 73°47′49″W

Information
- School type: Public, high School
- Motto: Via, Veritas, Vita (The Way, The Truth, The Life)
- Founded: 1960
- School board: Lester B. Pearson School Board
- Principal: Dean Graddon
- Grades: Secondary I-V (Grades 7-11)
- Enrollment: 1355
- Language: English; Courses in French and Spanish
- Colours: Green, white and Black
- Mascot: Knights
- Team name: Knights
- Website: stthomas.lbpsb.qc.ca

St. Thomas High School (French: École secondaire St. Thomas) is an English-language public high school in the municipality of Pointe-Claire, in Quebec, Canada. Founded in 1960, it was originally a Roman Catholic foundation, and it is a member of the International Baccalaureate Organization's certified Middle Years Programme. The school is the second-largest high school operated by the Lester B. Pearson School Board, after John Rennie High School, which is also located in Pointe-Claire. For the 2008 school year, St. Thomas High School ranked 1 out of all 466 schools in the province.

The present population is 1,355 students and includes students from thirty-nine Elementary Schools. St. Thomas has a Code of Conduct developed collaboratively by staff, and parents, which ensures a student's right to be educated in a caring, respectful environment. St. Thomas has an Honour Society in order to grant recognition to their top students.

The Lester B. Pearson School Board moved St. Thomas High (formerly at 120 Ambassador Avenue, Pointe Claire) into Lindsay Place High School in July 2021, whence Lindsay Place ceased to exist. The board's plan integrated the student populations from both high schools, with as little student displacement as possible.

== Notable alumni ==
- Paul Brousseau, drafted by the Quebec Nordiques
- Dr. Joe Cassidy, head of St Chad's College, Durham, England
- Jeremy Davies, drafted by the Nashville Predators
- Linda Griffiths, actress and playwright
- Ross Hull, Canadian actor
- Brittany Kennell, Canadian country music artist and former contestant on The Voice season 10
- Eric Langill, former MiLB player and current bullpen catcher for the New York Mets
- Terence McKenna, Canadian film producer, journalist
- Casey McKinnon, actress
- Autumn Phillips (née Kelly), the former wife of Peter Phillips
- Brandon Reid, former NHL player
- Michael Soles, former CFL player
- Rosemary Sullivan, poet and biographer
- Peter Szmidt, swimmer
- Larry Tittley, former star Canadian Football League player
- Joe Veleno, drafted by the Detroit Red Wings
