= Galacticast =

- Genre: Science fiction; comedy
- Created by: Casey McKinnon; Rudy Jahchan
- Written by: Casey McKinnon; Rudy Jahchan
- Directed by: Rudy Jahchan
- Starring: Casey McKinnon; Rudy Jahchan
- Country of origin: Canada
- Original language: English
- No. of seasons: 3
- No. of episodes: 71

Production
- Executive producers: Casey McKinnon; Rudy Jahchan
- Editor: Casey McKinnon
- Running time: Varies

Original release
- Release: May 8, 2006

Galacticast is a Canadian web series created by Rudy Jahchan and Casey McKinnon. The first episode aired on May 8, 2006.

The program is a sketch comedy video blog that parodies the latest science fiction or internet meme and responds to feedback from their loyal fanbase. Though it first launched as a variety channel, it later switched exclusively to comedy.

After a lengthy hiatus, the show came back in November 2008 with a fake commercial produced for comic artist Tony Moore.

== Cast ==
McKinnon and Jahchan usually take the lead roles in each episode, but also call on their friends and fellow actors to guest star. McKinnon often plays multiple characters in a single episode.

== Production ==
Most episodes are written and directed by Jahchan, with the exception of Battlestar Galacticast which was directed by independent filmmaker Matt Campagna. McKinnon is the primary editor, but special effects are usually done by both creators.

== Recurring characters ==
- McKinnon
- Jahchan
- Doctor Who
- Superman
- Queen Kong (reference to King Kong)
- Daleks
- Darth Vader
- Emperor Palpatine
- R2-D2

== Distribution ==
The show receives over 250,000 views each month and is available for subscription via YouTube, iTunes and RSS.

== Awards ==
Awards and nominations for Galacticast
Year	Award Show	Category	Result	Notes
2006	PodTech Vloggie Awards	Judges' Favorite Special Effects	Won	
2006	PodTech Vloggie Awards	Best Entertainment (Fiction)	Won	
2006	PodTech Vloggie Awards	Best Special Effects	Won	
2006	PodTech Vloggie Awards	Best Vlog Website Design	Won	
2006	PodTech Vloggie Awards	Best Collaboration	Won	For episode: "Node 666"
2007	Parsec Awards	Best Video Podcast	Nominated	
2007	Parsec Awards	Best Video Production	Nominated	
2007	Canadian Blog Awards	Best Podcaster/Vlogger	Nominated	
