= Shel Israel =

American writer

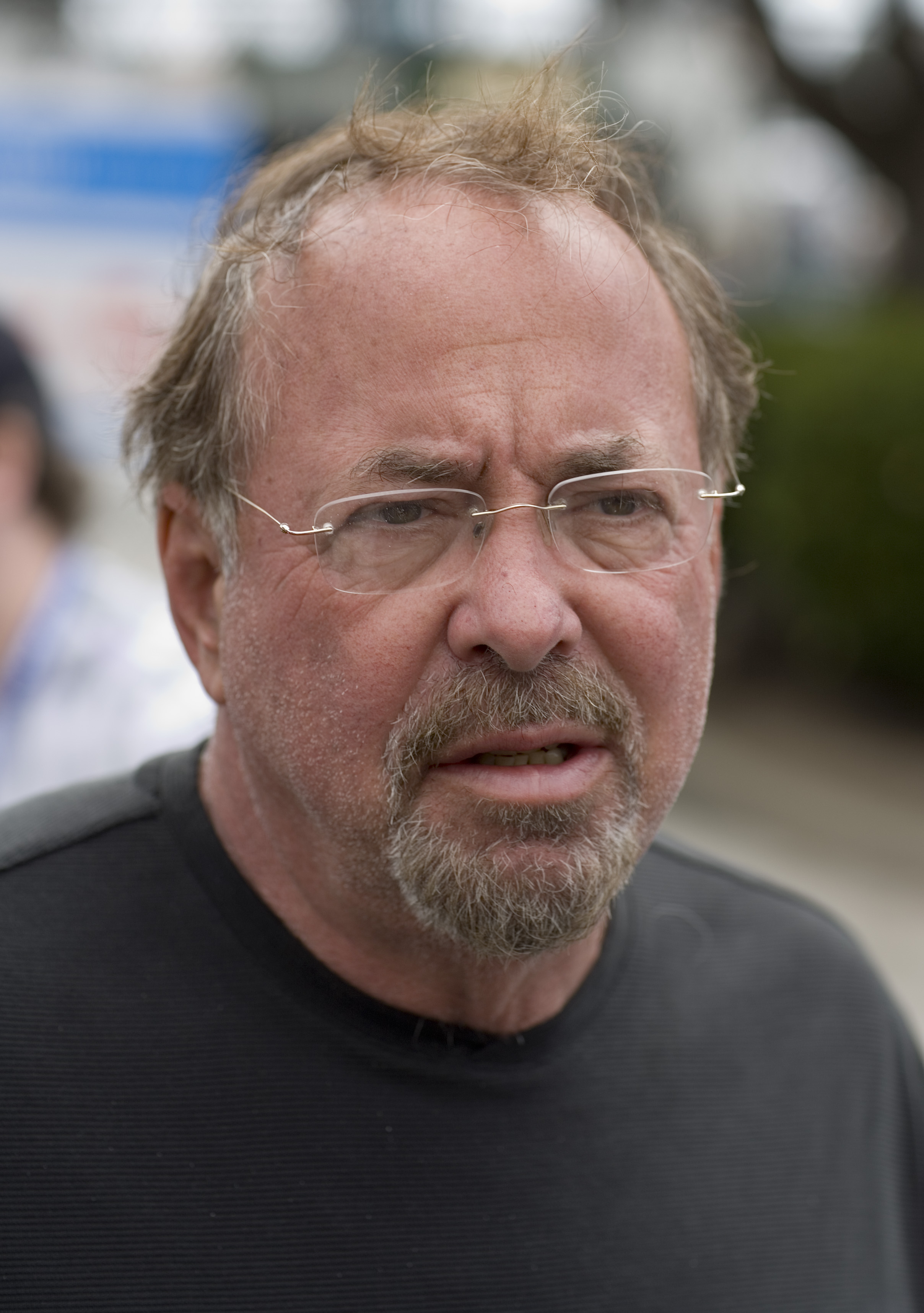
- Born: August 1944; New Bedford, Massachusetts
- Died: August 13, 2025 (aged 80–81)
- Occupation(s): Consultant and Author

Shel Israel (August 1944 – August 13, 2025) was a writer and speaker on social media issues.

In 2009 he completed a book called Twitterville on business uses for Twitter, published in September 2009. He has contributed editorially to BusinessWeek, Dow Jones Co, and FastCompany.TV.

He co-authored with Robert Scoble the book Naked Conversations, How Blogs are Changing the Way Businesses Talk with Customers (John Wiley & Son, 2006); in 2014 he released another book with Scoble, titled Age of Context: Mobile, Sensors, Data and the Future of Privacy. In September 2015 he self-published Lethal Generosity: Contextual Technology and the Competitive Edge discussing why technology and social changes are causing companies to lose control of their brands as their customers gain it. The three books are a trilogy that reveal the amazing changes technology has imposed on work and life over a ten-year-period. He has co-authored (with Robert Scoble) the book The Fourth Transformation: How Augmented Reality & Artificial Intelligence Will Change Everything (Patrick Brewster Press, Dec 7, 2016).

He published commentary on his own blog. Between books and speaking engagements he has contributed editorially to Forbes, FastCompany, BusinessWeek, and Business Insider. He was the host of Global Neighbourhoods with Shel Israel, an online video blog series, which was produced by FastCompany.TV, covering enterprise and trends in social media.

In March 2017, he founded Transformation Group, LLC, a company "dedicated to helping big brands develop and implement Mixed Reality (MR) strategies".

He lived in Silicon Valley, California and frequently spoke on social media related topics.
