= Gatcombe Park =

Country house and royal residence in Gloucestershire, England

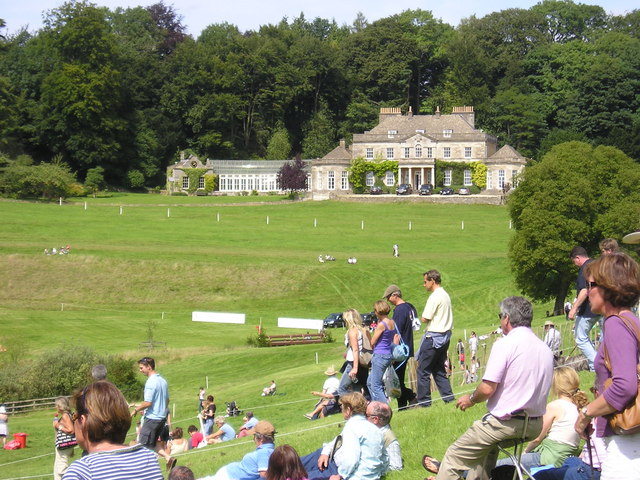
- The house from the park, in 2009

- Location within Gloucestershire
- 51.6933°N 2.1736°W
- Location: Minchinhampton, Gloucestershire
- OS grid reference: ST880994

History
- Built: 1774 (re-modelling in 1820)

Site notes
- Architect(s): Francis Franklin for original building; George Basevi for 19th century reconstruction
- Architectural style: Neoclassical
- Owner: Anne, Princess Royal

Listed Building – Grade II*
- Official name: Gatcombe Park House
- Designated: 28 June 1960
- Reference no.: 1091099

National Register of Historic Parks and Gardens
- Official name: Gatcombe Park House gardens and parkland
- Type: Grade II
- Designated: 28 February 1986
- Reference no.: 1000765

Listed Building – Grade II
- Official name: Stables and Coach House 80M east of Gatcombe Park
- Designated: 24 March 1988
- Reference no.: 1172412

Listed Building – Grade II
- Official name: Pyramid Monument 300M south of Gatcombe Park
- Designated: 24 March 1988
- Reference no.: 1091100

Gatcombe Park is a country house between the villages of Minchinhampton (to which it belongs) and Avening in Gloucestershire, England. Originally constructed in the 1770s, it was rebuilt from 1820 by George Basevi for the economist David Ricardo. Since 1976 it has been the country home of Anne, Princess Royal. Gatcombe is a Grade II* listed building. Parts of the grounds open for events, including horse trials and craft fairs.

== Location ==
Gatcombe Park is between the villages of Minchinhampton and Avening in Gloucestershire in South West England. Highgrove House, the country residence of Anne's brother, King Charles III, is located 6 miles (9.7 km) away in the parish of Doughton, near Tetbury. The first cousin of their mother, the late Queen, Prince Michael of Kent, owned nearby Nether Lypiatt Manor for 26 years from 1980.

== History ==
The manors of Minchinhampton and Avening formed the basis of the later Gatcombe Park estate. After the Dissolution of the Monasteries they were granted to Lord Windsor, whose family sold most of the land to Philip Sheppard in 1656. The core hillside land of the former estates, which was chiefly within the parish bounds of Gatcombe, was left in the will of Samuel Sheppard, who died in 1770, to his brother Edward. Edward, a clothier, had a new house built from 1771 to 1774. The house and estate were purchased in 1814 by the speculator and theoretical economist David Ricardo, MP, and altered to the designs of George Basevi (a relation), c.1820. It features Bath stone construction, and comprises five main bedrooms, four secondary bedrooms, four reception rooms, a library, a billiard room and a conservatory; staff accommodation and its steep-sloping grounds are a separately listed (Grade II) parkland.

== Courtauld & Butler: 1940–1976 ==
The previous owner was Lord Butler of Saffron Walden, Master of Trinity College, Cambridge, and a former Home Secretary, who had inherited the house from his father-in-law, the art collector Samuel Courtauld. Courtauld had acquired it from the Ricardo family in 1940.

== The Princess Royal: 1976–present ==
The house and home farm were bought by Queen Elizabeth II in 1976 for Princess Anne and Captain Mark Phillips; the price was not disclosed but is believed to have been between £500,000 and £750,000 (equivalent to £5,054,000 in 2025).

The Crown paid for the renovation and redecoration of the house for Princess Anne and Captain Phillips, who moved into it in November 1977. The property then covered approximately 730 acres (3.0 km^{2}), of which the bulk of its 200 acres (0.81 km^{2}) of woodland was part of the park land, including a lake containing brown trout. The property had extensive stabling for horses, including a new stable block, and an airstrip.

The estate was divided when the Princess Royal and Mark Phillips were divorced, and today the princess lives at Gatcombe Park with her second husband, Sir Timothy Laurence. Their children Peter and Zara Tindall each had a cottage on the estate until they married. Peter and his then wife, Autumn, moved to London afterwards.

=== Aston Farm ===
In 1978 the estate was enlarged by the purchase of Aston Farm to the east. After the divorce, for some years Mark Phillips lived at Aston Farm with his second wife, but he later moved to the United States. Zara and her husband, Mike Tindall, at first lived in Cheltenham after they were married in 2011, but in January 2013 they sold their house and moved to Aston Farm.

=== Events ===
The grounds of Gatcombe Park are known in the eventing world for hosting the Festival of British Eventing every year, over the first weekend in August. Organised by Mark Phillips, with considerable input from Princess Anne, the event attracts the world's top equestrian Olympians and over 40,000 paying spectators, as well as BBC Television coverage. Two smaller horse trials, in the spring and autumn, also take place on the estate, with courses designed by Princess Anne, and there is a biannual craft fair, with around 160 exhibitors, in May and October.
