= Casey McKinnon =

Canadian actress and producer

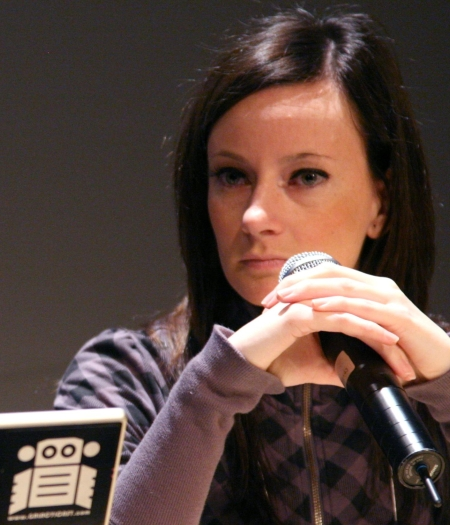
- McKinnon in October 2007
- Born: Montreal, Quebec, Canada
- Occupations: Actress, producer
- Notable work: Galacticast, A Comicbook Orange, Kitkast
- Website: caseymckinnon.com

Casey McKinnon is a Canadian actress and producer from Montreal, Quebec, Canada. She is known for her work on web series Galacticast, A Comicbook Orange and Kitkast.

== Background ==
Born and raised in Montreal, McKinnon attended St. Thomas High School with partner Rudy Jahchan and studied East Asian studies at McGill University alongside Autumn Phillips; herself both a McGill and St Thomas High School alumna. Before pursuing a full-time career in new media, she worked for the United Nations.

== Career ==
=== Web series ===
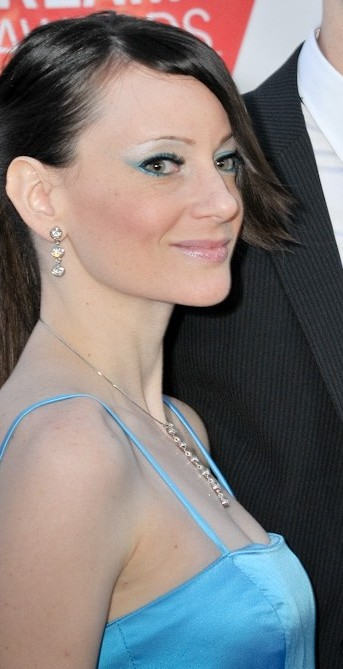
McKinnon at the 2009 Streamy Awards

McKinnon first became known under the pseudonym Ms. Kitka, the host of sex news and entertainment show Kitkast, launched on October 15, 2005. Inspired by podcasting and British television show Sin Cities, the show gained mainstream attention from Rolling Stone and The Guardian. Due to a desire to make a science fiction show, she decided to move onto other projects and launched Galacticast with her boyfriend Rudy Jahchan on May 8, 2006. Under the corporation name 8Bit Brownies Inc., the two went on to co-produce a short miniseries for Next New Networks filmed at South by Southwest called Pulp Secret Confessions and later launched the comic book and graphic novel review show A Comicbook Orange on June 6, 2006, where McKinnon worked as host. In July 2007, McKinnon was hired to host Pulp Secret Live At Comic-Con, where she made a daily update show live from San Diego Comic-Con.

In addition to her self-produced works, she has appeared in Geek Therapy alongside America Young, Star Wars inspired lightsaber battle Elf Sabers with The Guild's Teal Sherer, Babelgum original series Hurtling Through Space at an Alarming Rate as nemesis Kalm, and the fan imagined trailer for Elfquest.

=== Journalism ===
From July to October 2007, she wrote a monthly column for The Guardian following her experiences working in web video. The articles connect new media to their Hollywood predecessors and reflect a desire for Internet television to be taken seriously by the old media community.

== Filmography ==
=== Film ===
Year	Title	Role	Notes
2008	Six Reasons Why	Nomad's Mother	
2011	ElfQuest: A Fan Imagining	Brownberry	Short film
2011	Elf Sabers	Elf Casey	Short film
2012	Alice and the Monster	Posh Girl	
2016	Perchance to Dream	Proctor	Short film

=== Television ===
Year	Title	Role	Notes
2006	Torrent	Herself	Episode: "Episode 28"
2006	The Money Programme	Various	Archive footage from Galacticast
2010	EP Daily	Herself	1 episode

=== Theatre ===
Year	Title	Role	Notes
2014	Hamlet Max	Guildenstern	Hamlet set in a post-apocalyptic world
2014	Celini	Ashley	Serial Killers at Sacred Fools Theater Company
2014	A Woman of No Importance	Lady Stutfield	Sacred Fools Theater Company
2015	Sight Unseen	Grete	The Lounge Theatre on Theatre Row Hollywood
2016	The Tragedy of JFK (as told by Wm. Shakespeare)	Jacqueline Bouvier Kennedy	Produced by The Blank and based on Calpurnia in William Shakespeare's Julius Caesar.

=== Web ===
Year	Title	Role	Notes
2005	Kitkast	Ms. Kitka	20 episodes
2006-2008	Galacticast	Various	68 episodes
2006	Goodnight Burbank	Herself	Episode: "GNB 20 - No Pets Left Behind. Sprouts kill cancer. Walnuts fights transfats."
2007	Pulp Secret Live at Comic-Con	Herself	3 episodes
2007-2010	A Comicbook Orange	Herself	50 episodes
2007	CNET TV	Herself	2 episodes
2007	Pro at Cooking	Herself	Episode: "Episode 2"
2009	Hurtling Through Space at an Alarming Rate	Kalm	Episode: "The Wrath of Kalm"
2010	Rocketboom	Herself	Episode: "Casey McKinnon"
2010	Project: Comic-Con	Herself - Narrator (voice)	4 episodes
2010	The Web.Files	Herself	Episode: "A Comicbook Orange"
2010	The RadNerd Show	Herself	Episode: "Casey McKinnon"
2010	Fanboy Funhouse	Futuristic Mullet Chick/Herself	2 episodes
2010	BlackBoxTV	Angela Billson	Episode: "This Is For You Baby!"
2010	Bumps in the Night	Captain Howdy/Bunny	2 episodes
2011	Elevator	Lucy	Episode: "Harold the Janitor's Dad"
2011	Midday at Noon	Vampira	Episode: "Infidelity"
2012	Geek Therapy	Steve Jobs Grief Counselor	Episode: "Steve Jobs Mourner"
2012	Tabletop	Herself	Episode: "Dixit"
2013	Shelf Life	Young Hero Lass Singer (voice)	Episode: "Powered Up"
2014	IRrelevant Astronomy	Computer technician	Episode: "Fusion vs. Fission"

== Awards and nominations ==
As a producer, McKinnon's work on Galacticast garnered five PodTech Vloggie Awards and three Parsec nominations, while A Comicbook Orange was nominated for Best Hosted Web Series in the 2nd Streamy Awards and won Best Web Non-Fiction in Clicker.com's Best of 2010 awards.

She has also been named a sexy geek by the Montreal Gazette and blogger Violet Blue.

Awards and nominations for Casey McKinnon
Year	Award Show	Category	Nominated work	Result
2012	Inaugural IAWTV Awards	Best Host (Taped)	A Comicbook Orange	Nominated
2016	BroadwayWorld Los Angeles Awards	Best Featured Actress in a Play (Local Production)	The Tragedy of JFK (as told by Wm. Shakespeare)	Won
