= Nailsworth Town Hall =

Municipal building in Nailsworth, Gloucestershire, England

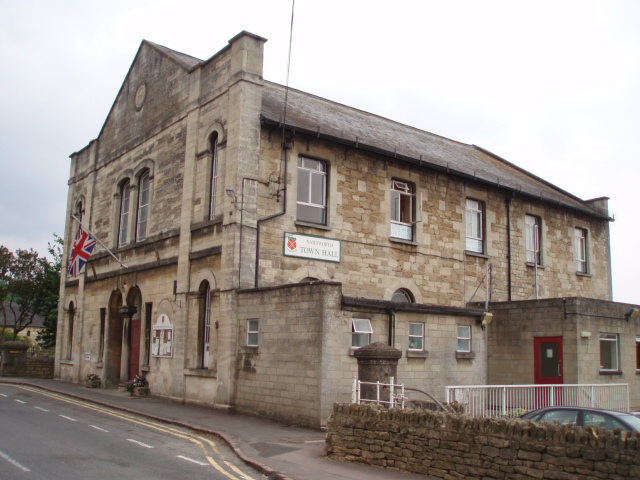
- Nailsworth Town Hall

- Shown in Gloucestershire
- 51.6927°N 2.2196°W
- Location: Old Bristol Road, Nailsworth

History
- Built: 1868

Site notes
- Architectural style: Italianate style

Nailsworth Town Hall is a municipal building in Old Bristol Road in Nailsworth, Gloucestershire, England. The structure currently operates as the meeting place of Nailsworth Town Council as well as a community events venue.

== History ==
Following the appointment of the Rev. William Jackson from Bilston as the new priest at the Shortwood Baptish Church in Nailsworth, a dissenting group of about 80 worshipers decided to break away from the church and commission their own place of workshop. Their new building was designed in the Italianate style, built in ashlar stone and was officially opened as "the Tabernacle" in 1868.

The design involved a symmetrical main frontage of three bays facing onto Old Bristol Road. The central bay featured a pair of closely-set round-headed doorways, separated by a Corinthian order column, with architraves and keystones. There was a pair of closely-set segmental-headed windows on the first floor and a pediment above, with a circular date stone in the tympanum. The outer bays were fenestrated by round-headed lancet windows on the ground floor and by segmental-headed lancet windows on the first floor. The bays were flanked by full-height pilasters supporting a small cornice. Internally, the principal room was the main hall where religious services were held.

The dissenters gradually re-joined the main congregation after a new Baptist chapel was erected in Newmarket Road in 1881. The Old Bristol Road building was eventually sold to the Wesleyan Methodist Church in 1911. After the Wesleyan congregation moved to Spring Hill in 1947, the Old Bristol Road building was then sold to Nailsworth Urban District Council for use as a town hall.

The building continued to serve as the local of seat of government until the enlarged Stroud District Council was formed in 1974. It subsequently became the meeting place of Nailsworth Town Council, as well as a community events venue, hosting concerts and theatrical performances. The local football team, Forest Green Rovers F.C., visited the town hall for a reception, to celebrate winning the FA Vase in 1982. In 2017, the town hall also started operating as an art gallery and began providing child care services.
