= Avening Valley =

Valley in England

Coordinates: 51°40′52″N 2°10′29″W

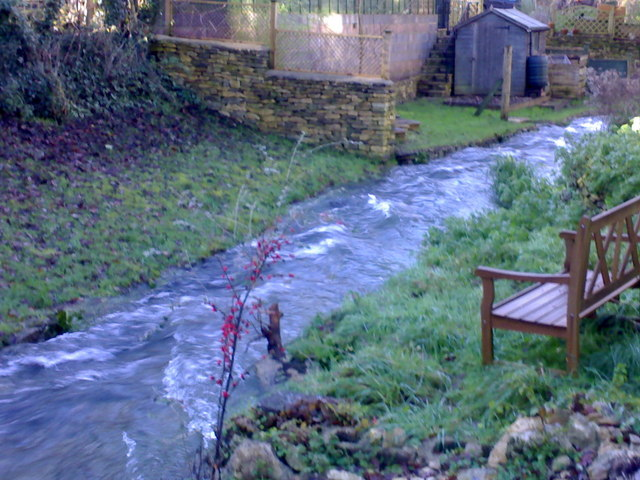
Avening Stream in Sandford Leaze

The Avening Valley is located in the South Cotswolds in England, running roughly east from Nailsworth and through the village of Avening.

During the 17th century, the cloth industry developed in the Avening Valley, with mills powered by the Avening Stream. One of the larger cloth mills was named the Holcombe Mill (an old "gig" mill), which was adapted in 1879 for the manufacture of bedding. Another mill was located at Longfords Mills, Minchinhampton.
