= Autumn Phillips =

Former granddaughter-in-law of Elizabeth II (born 1978)

- Born: Autumn Patricia Kelly; May 3, 1978 (age 48); Montreal, Quebec, Canada
- Education: St. Thomas High School
- Alma mater: McGill University (BA)
- Spouse: Peter Phillips (m. 2008; div. 2021)
- Children: 2

Autumn Patricia Kelly (born May 3, 1978) is the Canadian former wife of Peter Phillips, who is the son of Anne, Princess Royal and the eldest grandchild of Queen Elizabeth II and Prince Philip, Duke of Edinburgh. After graduating from McGill University in 2002, she met Phillips in her birthplace and hometown of Montreal, Quebec. Their engagement was announced on July 28, 2007, and they were married in St George's Chapel at Windsor Castle, on May 17, 2008. They have two daughters. The couple separated in 2019, and divorced in 2021.

== Early life ==
Autumn Kelly, her twin brother Christopher "Chris" and her older brother Kevin, were born in Montreal, Quebec, to Kathleen "Kitty" (née McCarthy) and Brian Kelly, an executive at Hydro-Québec. She was baptised on June 18, 1978, at Saint John Fisher Parish Church, and raised in Cedar Park, Pointe-Claire, in the English-speaking West Island region of Montreal. Her parents divorced when she was eight, after which her mother married commercial pilot Ron Magas and her father married Lynne, with whom he has two children, Jessica and Patrick.

Kelly's family continued to live in the Pointe-Claire area, where she attended a Roman Catholic parochial school, and then St. Thomas High School, a Roman Catholic foundation. It was reported in 2007 that St Thomas' was where Kelly had both excelled at sports and had also studied alongside fellow student and friend, actress Casey McKinnon. Kelly then attended McGill University, during which time she worked as a bartender, model, and actress, appearing in the 1996 film Rainbow, taking the non-speaking, though credited, role of Tigrette Number 3, and later in the television series Sirens. Kelly graduated from McGill in 2002, with a Bachelor of Arts degree in East Asian studies, whereupon she started a career as a management consultant.

== Marriage and family ==
Kelly met Peter Phillips when he attended the 2003 Canadian Grand Prix as part of his employment with Williams F1. She did not know, until six weeks later, when she saw him on television, that he was Queen Elizabeth II's grandson. She then moved to the United Kingdom, living with Phillips in a Kensington, London, apartment and a cottage on the Gatcombe Park estate. Before meeting him, she had accepted a job with an American computer firm in England, and later worked as a personal assistant to broadcaster Michael Parkinson, while also attending royal events, such as the dinner party at the Ritz Hotel for the Queen's 80th birthday.

Their engagement was announced by the royal family on July 28, 2007, and the Queen subsequently gave her consent to the union, as required by the Royal Marriages Act 1772, after a meeting of the Privy Council on April 9 of the following year. Phillips proposed to her with "a platinum ring containing an oval centre diamond with more diamonds on either side".

Kelly, who had been raised a Roman Catholic and educated at Catholic foundation schools, was received into the Church of England (Anglican), which does not re-confirm people who were raised in churches acknowledging the apostolic succession. Had she remained Catholic after her marriage, under the provisions of the Act of Settlement 1701, her husband would have lost his place in the line of succession to the throne. That fact received widespread press coverage and drew attention to the Act of Settlement's bar on Catholics ascending to the throne, and prompted calls in both Canada and the United Kingdom for the respective prime ministers to consider the issue. She did not give up her Canadian citizenship. Some reported unease was caused in royal circles when Kelly and Phillips were interviewed and photographed by Hello! magazine, for a reported fee of £500,000.

The couple married on May 17, 2008, at St George's Chapel at Windsor Castle with 300 guests in attendance. The service was conducted by David Conner, Dean of Windsor, and Kelly's dress was designed by Sassi Holford. For the occasion, the Princess Royal lent Kelly the Festoon Tiara which she had received as a gift in 1973 in Hong Kong, and Kelly wore a necklace and earrings from her husband. Her six bridesmaids included Zara Phillips, her husband's sister. The couple had a carriage procession before going to Frogmore House for a reception. In 2010, they returned to London after living in Hong Kong, where Peter Phillips had a job with the Royal Bank of Scotland, heading its sports sponsorship activities in the region.

Autumn and Peter's first child, and the Queen's first great-grandchild, Savannah Anne Kathleen, was born in 2010 at Gloucestershire Royal Hospital. With dual citizenship, the child is the first Canadian citizen to be in the line of succession to the thrones of the Commonwealth realms. In 2012, at the same hospital, Phillips gave birth to another girl, Isla Elizabeth.

Autumn and Peter Phillips separated in 2019. Their divorce was settled on June 14, 2021, after which she began a relationship with Donal Mulryan, brother of Sean Mulryan and the founder of the UK development and construction company Rockwell. As of June 2022, she was living in Cirencester, close by to her ex-husband and daughters.
