= Nailsworth =

Town in Gloucestershire, England

Coordinates: 51.6954°N 2.2234°W

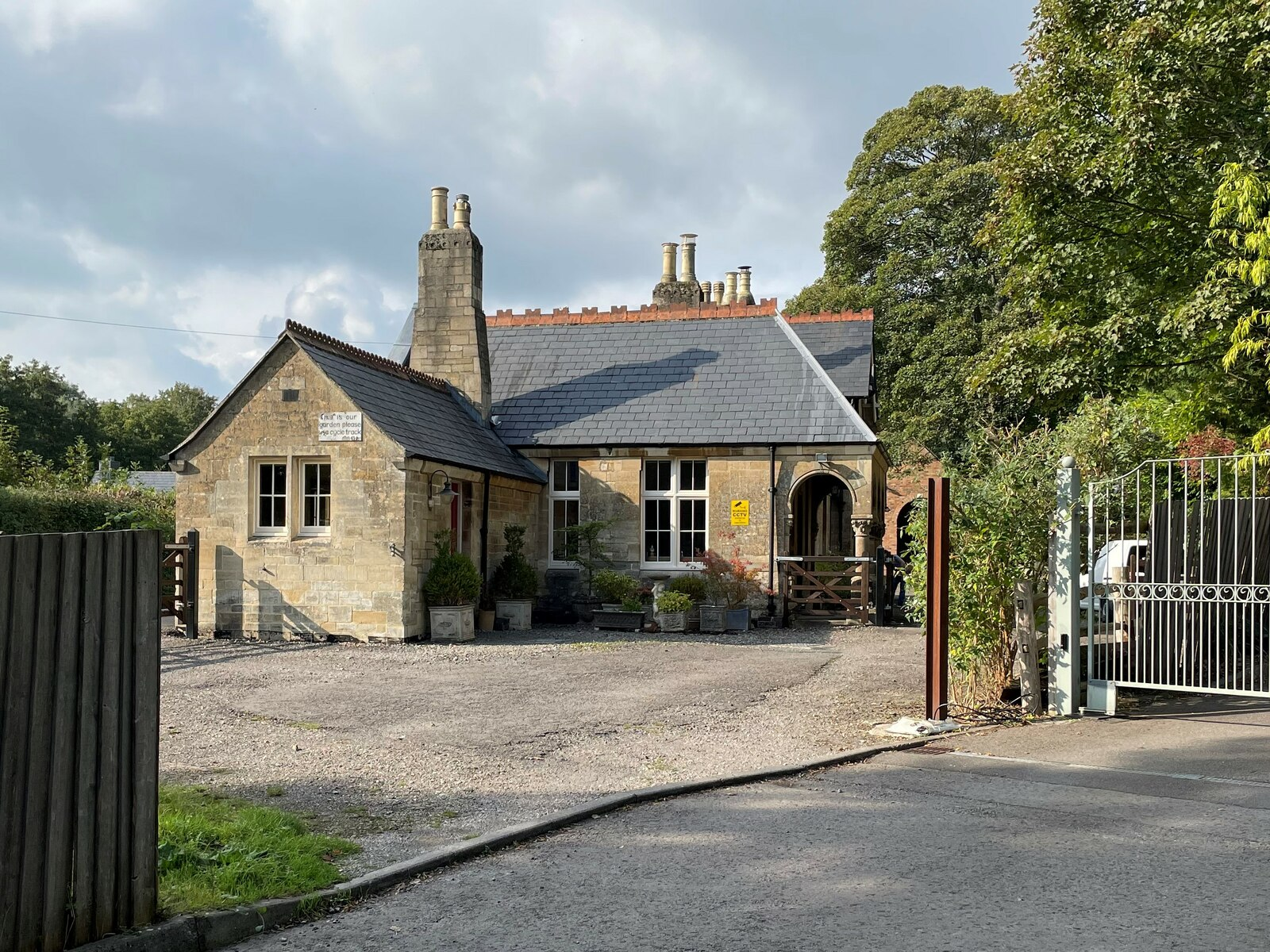
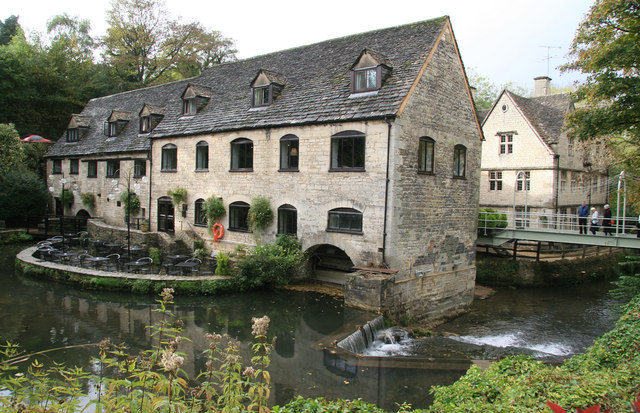
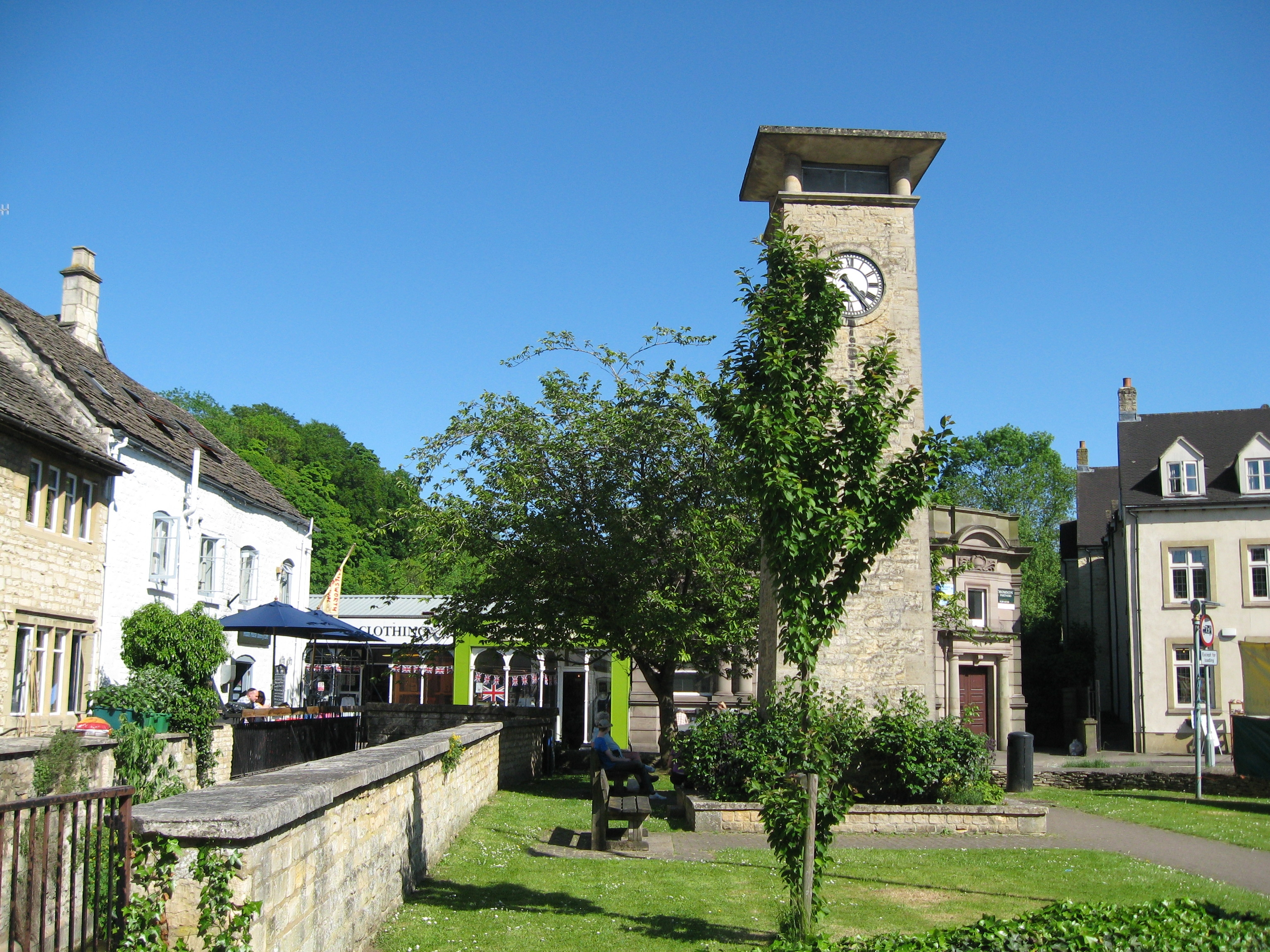
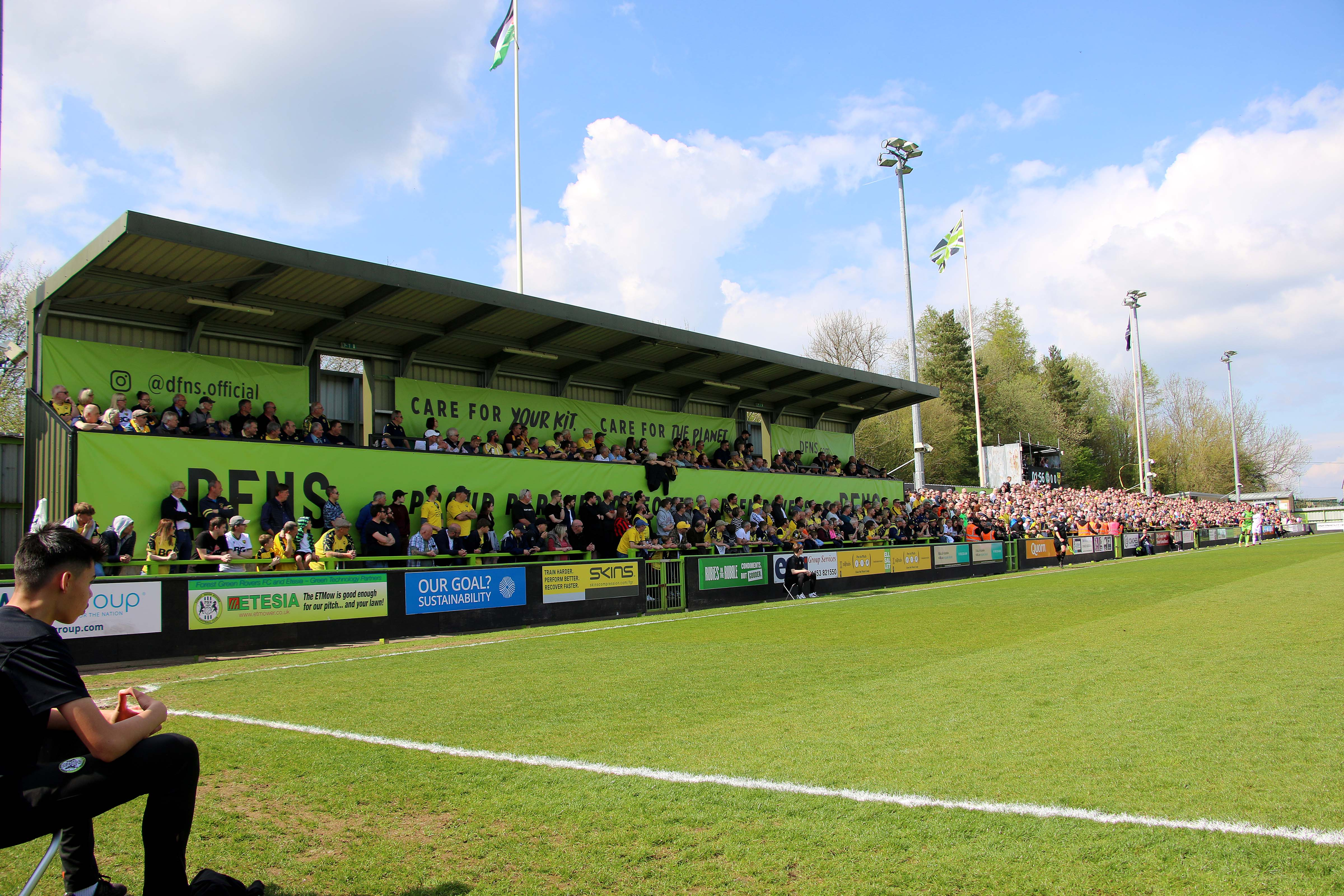
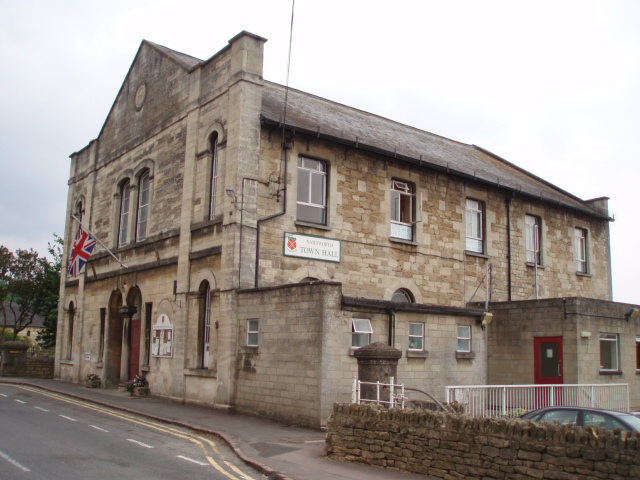
- Nailsworth Station Egypt Mill Clock Tower in the Town Centre The New Lawn Nailsworth Town Hall

- Location within Gloucestershire
- Population: 5,688 (2021 census)
- OS grid reference: ST8499
- Civil parish: Nailsworth
- District: Stroud
- Shire county: Gloucestershire
- Region: South West
- Country: England
- Sovereign state: United Kingdom
- Post town: Stroud
- Postcode district: GL6
- Dialling code: 01453
- Police: Gloucestershire
- Fire: Gloucestershire
- Ambulance: South Western
- UK Parliament: Stroud

Nailsworth is a town and civil parish in the Stroud District in Gloucestershire, England, lying in one of the Stroud Valleys in the Cotswolds, on the A46 road, four miles (six kilometres) south of Stroud and about 25 miles (40 kilometres) northeast of Bristol and Bath. The parish had a population of 5,688 at the 2021 census.

== History ==
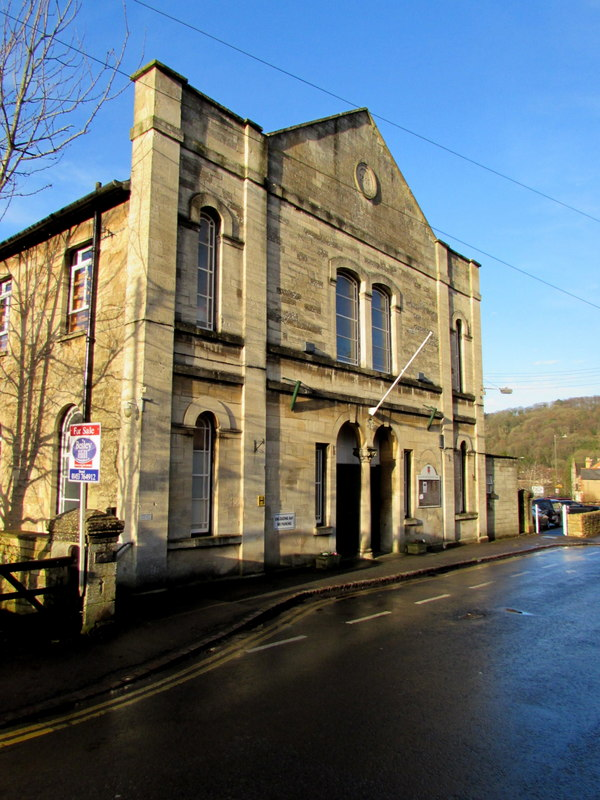
Nailsworth Town Hall

Nailsworth in ancient times was a settlement at the confluence of the Avening Valley and the Woodchester Valley, on the Nailsworth Stream. Among many notable historic medieval buildings in the area are Beverston Castle and Owlpen Manor. Nailsworth Town Hall, built as a chapel for a dissenting congregation, was completed in 1867.

In the modern era, Nailsworth was a small mill town and centre for brewing, powered by Nailsworth Stream. It was connected directly to the UK national rail network between 1867 and 1947, as the terminus of the Stonehouse and Nailsworth Railway.

== Amenities ==
These days Nailsworth is visited in the summer by walkers. It holds a farmers' market every fourth Saturday in the month. Local events such as the market and the Nailsworth Festival are still announced by a town crier.

Over the past decade the small town centre has been reinvigorated. Besides numerous restaurants and cafes, it now contains a number of shops, including bakers, a delicatessen with a fishmonger, a hardware store, butchers, craft shops, bookshops, art galleries and a gardening shop.

Nailsworth remains connected by regular public transport; it is the terminus of the hourly Stagecoach Gold bus route 63 from Gloucester via Stroud.

== St George's Church ==
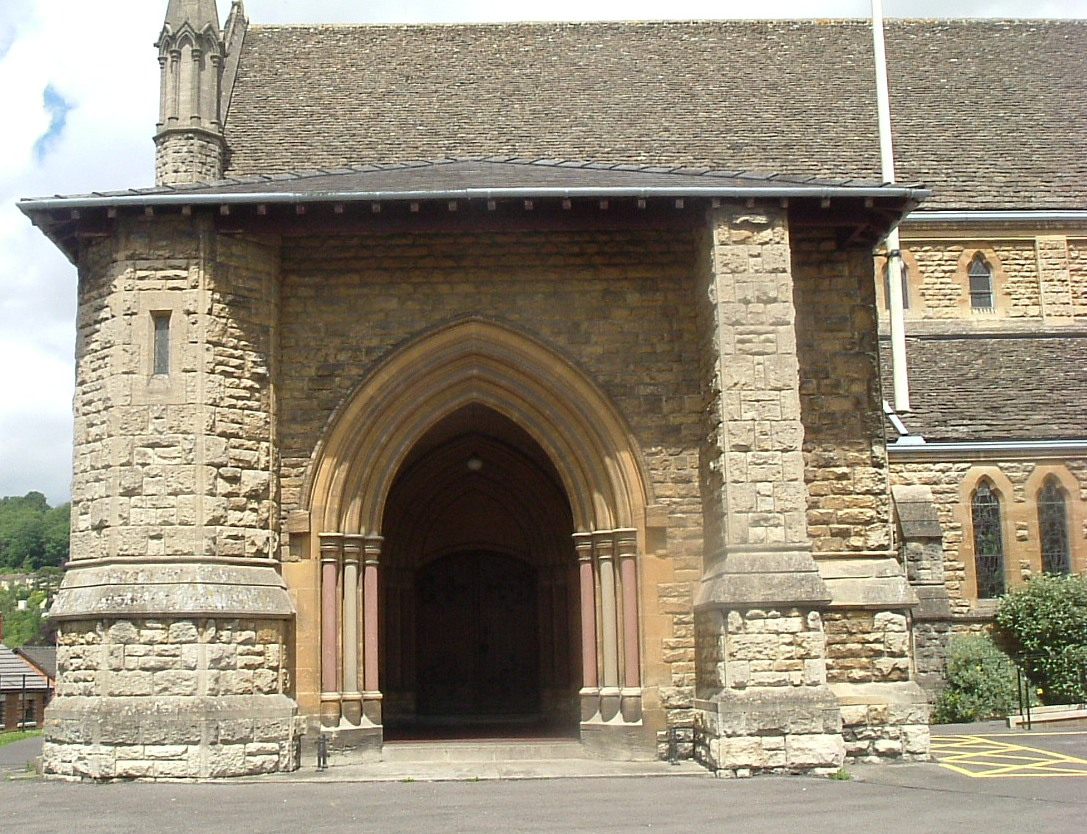
The entrance to St George's Church

Built on the higher ground at the centre of town, St George's was consecrated in November 1900. Before 1895, the Church of England had provided for Nailsworth through several neighbouring parishes. The new church, which can now seat 500, was designed in the Early English style by M. H. Medland of Gloucester. A shortfall in funding meant that neither a tower or a chancel was provided. The large entrance was originally designed as a tower, but the elevated ground was found to be too unstable to support the weight, resulting in the unusual porch. A chancel, the Lady Chapel, and vestries were added in 1939, commemorating those from the town who died in World War I. In 1980 a parish room was completed. The church has no churchyard.

Three of the stained glass windows in the south aisle, depicting St Luke, St Paul and St Barnabas, are by Charles Eamer Kempe. Three others depict St Richard of Chichester, St George and St Martin of Tours. A further window, by Herbert Bryans, shows Anna the Prophetess (Luke 2:36–38) The East window was designed by Peter Strong and installed in 1977. On the west wall is a mural painted by Sir Oliver Heywood in 1985, showing community life in the town.

== Christ Church and Tabernacle Church ==
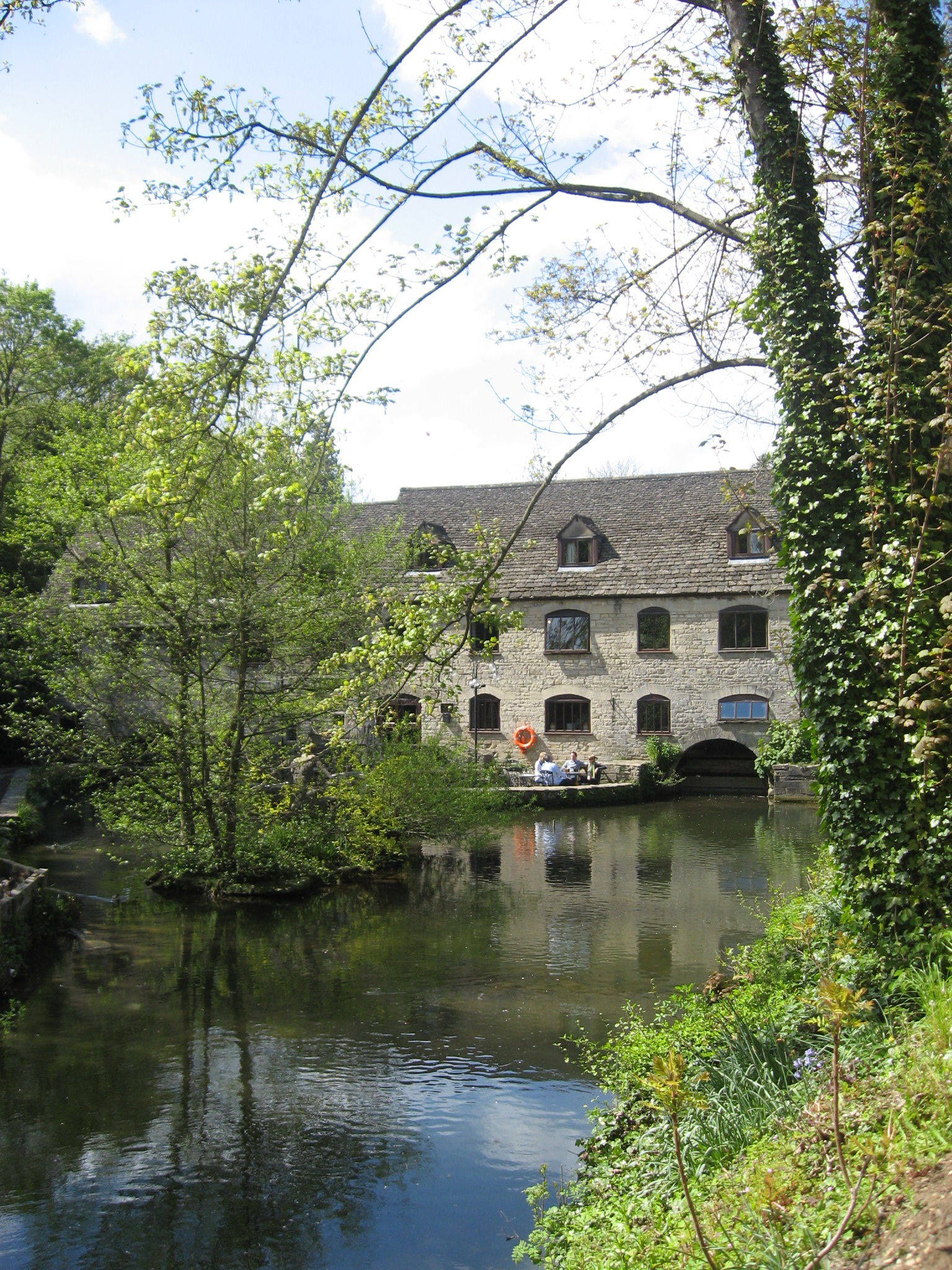
Egypt Mill Hotel

In 1837, the Baptist chapel at Shortwood was rebuilt and by 1851 was serving a congregation of over 1,000 despite an exodus of nearly 100 members to Australia in the previous decade. In 1864 disagreements over the appointment of a new minister saw a secession, with some members leaving to open the Nailsworth Tabernacle Church. The division lasted until 1910. In the 1960s, Shortwood, in conjunction with the Forest Green Congregationalists, established a new church, Christ Church. In 1972 the Shortwood congregation joined the United Reformed Church.

== Governance ==
Nailsworth Ward in Stroud

An electoral ward in the same name exists. This mainly covers Nailsworth, but also stretches south to Horsley. The total ward population at the 2011 census was 6,614.

=== Twinned ===
Nailsworth is twinned with Lèves, France, with which it enjoys an exchange visit in alternate years. In 2019, Nailsworth signed a Friendship Agreement with the Village of Perry, New York, United States of America.

== Demographics ==
Census population of Nailsworth parish
Census	Population	Female	Male	Households	Source
2001	5,276	2,669	2,607	2,206	
2011	5,794	3,011	2,783	2,521	
2021	5,688	2,952	2,736	2,581	

== Sport and recreation ==
Forest Green Rovers is the premier football club in Nailsworth and at The New Lawn stadium in Forest Green. After winning the 2017 National League Play-off Final the club were promoted to League 2, making Nailsworth the smallest settlement ever to host an English Football League team. They were crowned League 2 champions in 2022, but immediately relegated from EFL League One the following season. They were relegated to the National League the following season. The town also has a non-League football club, Shortwood United F.C. at the Meadowbank Ground in Shortwood. It plays in the Hellenic League Division One, part of the tenth tier of the English football league system.

== Media ==
Local television coverage is provided by BBC West and ITV West Country. Television signals are received from either of the local relay transmitters (Nailsworth and Stroud). Local radio stations are BBC Radio Gloucestershire on 95 FM and Heart West on 103 FM. The Stroud News and Journal is the weekly local newspaper that serves the town. A magazine, Nailsworth News, is produced by volunteers and delivered to all houses in the parish. It has 10 issues a year.

== Notable people ==
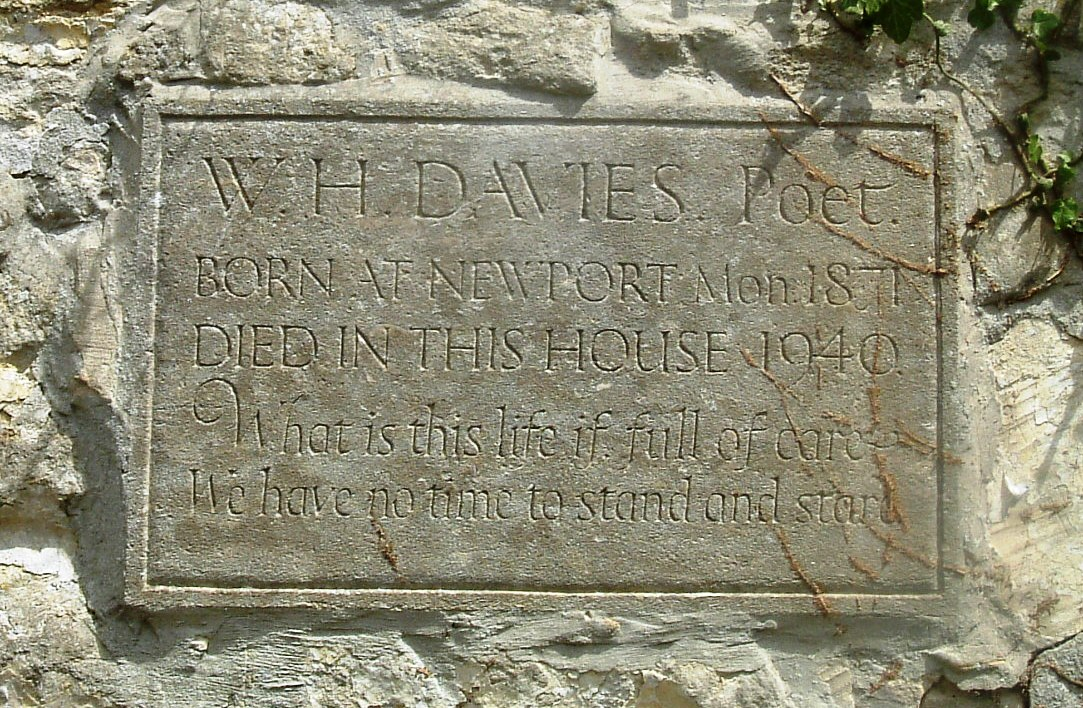
Plaque on the cottage "Glendower" in Watledge commemorating W. H. Davies

In birth order:

- Mary Deverell (1731–1805), sermon writer, poet and playwright, died here.
- Joseph Edkins (1823–1905), translator and missionary to China, was born here.
- W. H. Davies (1871–1940), Newport-born tramp poet, lived here from the mid-1920s until his death.
- John Furnival (1933–2020), artist of visual and concrete poetry who lived most of his life near Nailsworth.
- Michael Bichard, Baron Bichard (born 1947), civil servant, is from Nailsworth.
- Pete Reed (born 1981), Olympic rower, was brought up in Nailsworth.

== See also ==
- Moschatel Press
