= Rudy Jahchan =

- Born: Rudy Jahchan; March 30, 1979 (age 47); Bahrain
- Other names: Zod, Coderonin
- Notable work: Galacticast, A Comicbook Orange, and Kitkast
- Website: http://www.rudyjahchan.com

Rudy Jahchan is the co-producer and star of the internet shows Galacticast, A Comicbook Orange, and Kitkast. The primary writer and director of the shows, he managed the technical aspects such as devising the special effects and developing their websites, and co-starred alongside Casey McKinnon.

== Education and early career ==
Born in Bahrain, and raised there and Canada, Rudy took his B.Sc. in Computer Science at McGill University, graduating with distinction in 2000, and pursued a career in software and web development.

== Web series ==
Rudy Jahchan first became known under the pseudonym “Zod”, the man behind the scenes of video blog Kitkast. It debuted on October 15, 2005, and received an average 40,000 weekly viewers by the end of its run in March 2006.

He next launched Galacticast as a weekly science fiction parody show on May 8, 2006. Becoming known for its Robot Chicken like fan-based humor, and recreation of Hollywood effects with minimal budget, it has a following of over a quarter million viewers a month. Highlighted by the BBC, the Montreal Gazette, and the Hollywood Reporter, on November 5, 2006 Galacticast won five Vloggies including the People’s Choice for Best Special Effects, Best Entertainment, and Best Website.

His most recent project was A Comicbook Orange, a review show for comics and graphic novels.

== Awards ==
Awards and nominations for Rudy Jahchan
| Year | Award Show | Category | Work | Result |
|---|---|---|---|---|
| 2012 | Inaugural IAWTV Awards | Best Writing (Non-Fiction) | A Comicbook Orange | Won |
| 2012 | Dragon*Con Short Film Festival | Best Science Fiction | D.N.E.: Do Not Erase | Won |
