= Egypt Mill =

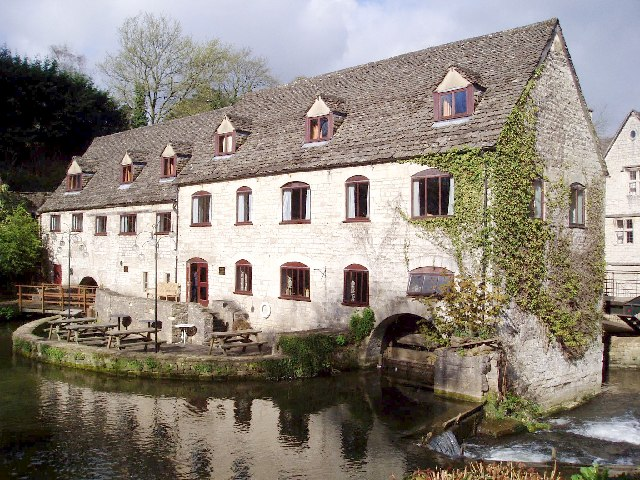

General information
- Status: Grade II* listed building
- Town or city: Nailsworth
- Country: United Kingdom
- Coordinates: 51°41′51″N 2°13′09″W

Website
- egyptmill.com

Egypt Mill is a Grade II* listed building and a former mill located in Nailsworth, a market town within the Stroud district of Gloucestershire, England. The oldest parts of the building date from the 14th century, but the majority dates from the 16th century. Haberdasher George Hudson bought the property in 1656. Two decades later, in 1675, Hudson and his partner Henry Willoughby leased the mill to clothier Richard Webb. The building remained in the hands of the Webb family until 1832, when it was sold to Playne & Smith. Peter Playne had previously been the tenant. Late in the 19th century it became a dyeworks and was later used for grinding corn and animal feed and was run by G.H. King & Sons. Egypt Mill has been a restaurant, hotel and event venue since the 1980s.
