= Church of the Holy Cross, Avening =

Church in Gloucestershire, England

Coordinates: 51.6806°N 2.1755°W

Church of the Holy Cross
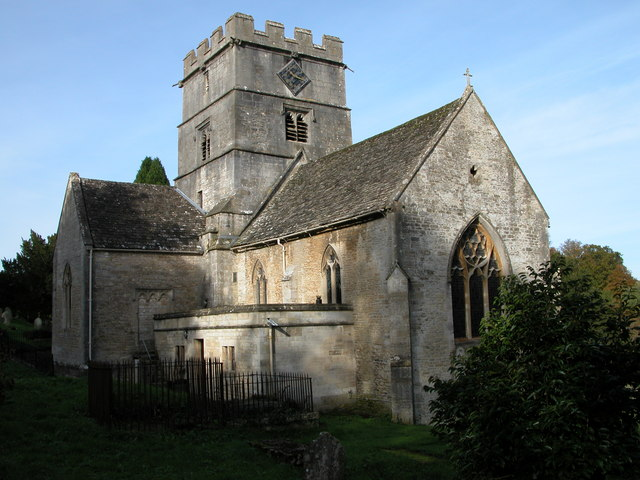

- Denomination: Church of England
- Website: www.aveningchurch.info

Architecture
- Heritage designation: Grade I listed building
- Designated: 6 September 1954

Administration
- Province: Canterbury
- Diocese: Gloucester
- Parish: Avening

The Anglican Church of the Holy Cross at Avening in the Cotswold District of Gloucestershire, England, was built in late 11th century. It is a grade I listed building.

== History ==
Outside the church is a stone coffin from before the Norman Conquest.

Parts of the church date from the late 11th century. It was commissioned by Queen Matilda of Flanders, wife of William the Conqueror.

The tower, west bay of the chancel, north aisle, and north doorway were added in the 12th century. The transepts were added in the late 13th. The top storey of the tower was added in the 14th century.

From the 11th to 14th century the church was the property of the Abbey of Sainte-Trinité, Caen, although this was disputed by Tewkesbury Abbey.

The building was restored in 1902, after part of the tower had collapsed causing damage to part of the nave and north aisle.

The parish is part of the benefice of Avening with Cherington within the Diocese of Gloucester.

== Architecture ==
The Cotswold stone building is cruciform in layout. It has a two-bay north aisle with a porch. The nave has a 14th-century wagon roof. There are parts of the Norman architecture still intact including the doorway, arcade and chancel arch. The three-stage tower is supported by buttresses.

The interior includes a table from 1657. There are several monuments and tablets along with a kneeling effigy of Henry Brydges of Avening Court. The stained glass of the East Window is by Clayton and Bell and two in the nave by Christopher Whall.

The war memorial tablet commemorates villagers who died in the First World War, Second World War and the Iraq War.
