= Avening =

Village in Gloucestershire, England

Coordinates: 51°41′N 2°10′W

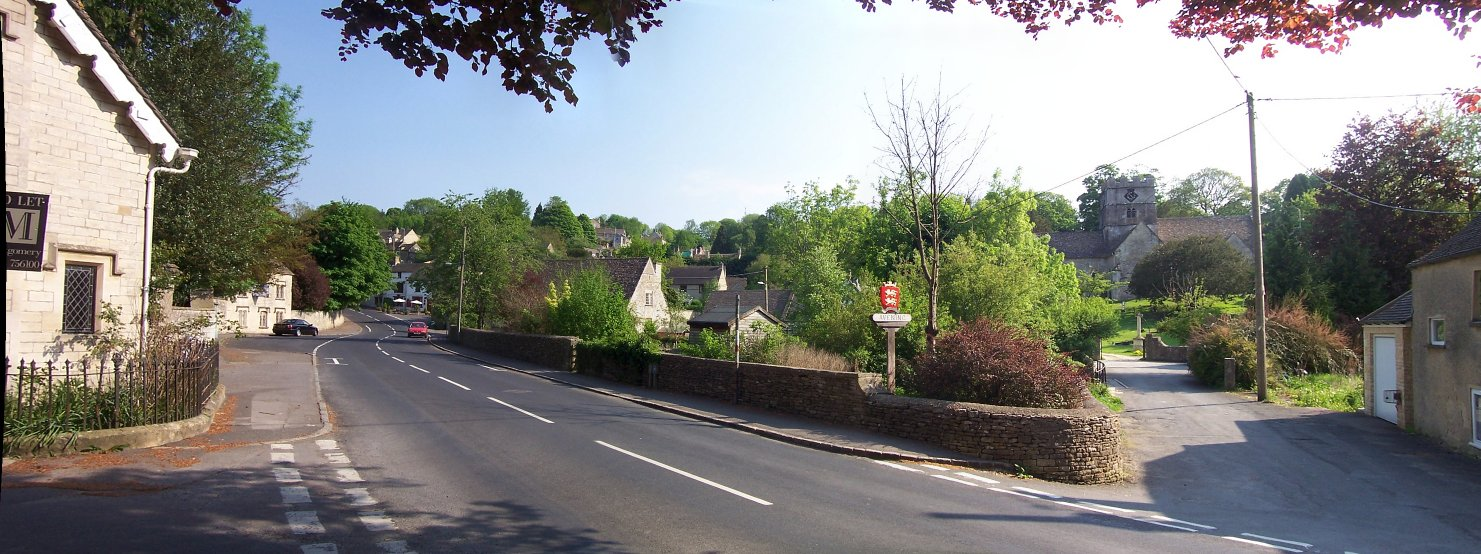

- Location within Gloucestershire
- Population: 1,031 (2011 Census)
- District: Cotswold
- Shire county: Gloucestershire
- Region: South West
- Country: England
- Sovereign state: United Kingdom
- Post town: Tetbury
- Postcode district: GL8
- Police: Gloucestershire
- Fire: Gloucestershire
- Ambulance: South Western
- UK Parliament: South Cotswolds

Avening (/ˈeɪvnɪŋ/) is a village and civil parish in the Cotswold district of Gloucestershire, England, about three miles (5 km) north of Tetbury. According to the 2001 census it had a population of 1,094, decreasing to 1,031 at the 2011 census. Nearby is Gatcombe Park, the home of the Princess Royal.

== Etymology ==
The name Avening is first attested in an early 11th-century manuscript of a charter of 896, in the dative case, in the Old English phrase to Æfeningum ("to Avening"). In the nominative case, this word would have been Æfeningas. Throughout the 20th century, scholars agreed that the stream running through Avening must, like a number of other rivers in Britain, have been called "Avon", and that this word was combined with the Old English suffix -ingas ("people, tribe"). Thus the name Æfeningas was thought to have meant "people of the Avon".

However, in 2016–18, Richard Coates argued that this explanation was problematic (there is no evidence that the river was called "Avon" and the expected Old English spelling of a word based on that name would have been **Afeningas, not Æfeningas; moreover, place-names ending in -ingas are not otherwise found based on river-names). While recognising that he had no good alternative etymology to offer, Coates argued that the Gaulish place-name Aven(n)io, now Avignon, would from a phonological point of view be a viable basis for Æfeningas. Thus the name may have meant "people from Avignon", referring to a settlement of people from that area of Gaul, perhaps monks sent to Britain.

=== Related place names ===
Avening is also the name of a rural community immediately south of Creemore, Ontario, Canada, on the Mad River. One of its pioneers was Frederick Thornbury, who built a flour mill and a sawmill in the Ontario community in 1860, and named the settlement "after his native place in England".

== History and geography ==
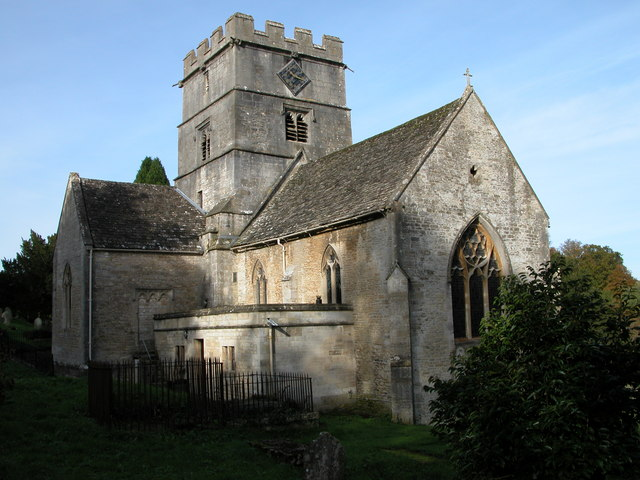
Church of the Holy Cross, Avening

Through Avening runs an unnamed stream which is a tributary of the River Frome.

The Anglican Church of the Holy Cross was built in the late 11th century. It is a Grade I listed building.

During the Second World War, Avening lay on the GHQ Line, part of anti-invasion preparations. Extensive anti-tank ditches were constructed to the south and southeast, and were overlooked by a number of pillboxes.

== Governance ==
Avening has a parish council, consisting of nine elected members.

An electoral ward of the same name stretches from Avening in the west to Long Newnton in the south east. The total population of this ward taken at the 2011 census was 1,930.

== Notable people ==
- John Sirgood (1822–85), Christian fundamentalist lay preacher, shoemaker and draper.
- Caroline Playne (1857–1948), historian, pacifist and anti-war activist.
- Arthur Lee, 1st Viscount Lee of Fareham (1868–1947), soldier, diplomat, politician and philanthropist; with Lady Lee he lived at Old Quarries, a Grade II listed building. He donated his country house, Chequers, to the nation as a retreat for the Prime Minister.
- Michael Powell (1905–90), film director, producer, screenwriter, actor; died and buried locally. His gravestone was designed by his son Columba, who appeared in some of his films.
- Pamela Brown (1917–75), actress, she spent her last days with Michael Powell; died and buried locally.
- Tony Hall (1928–2019), music business executive, columnist, record producer, TV presenter and radio DJ.

Richard E. Grant

== See also ==
- Avening Valley
