= Robert Scoble =

American blogger, technical evangelist, and author

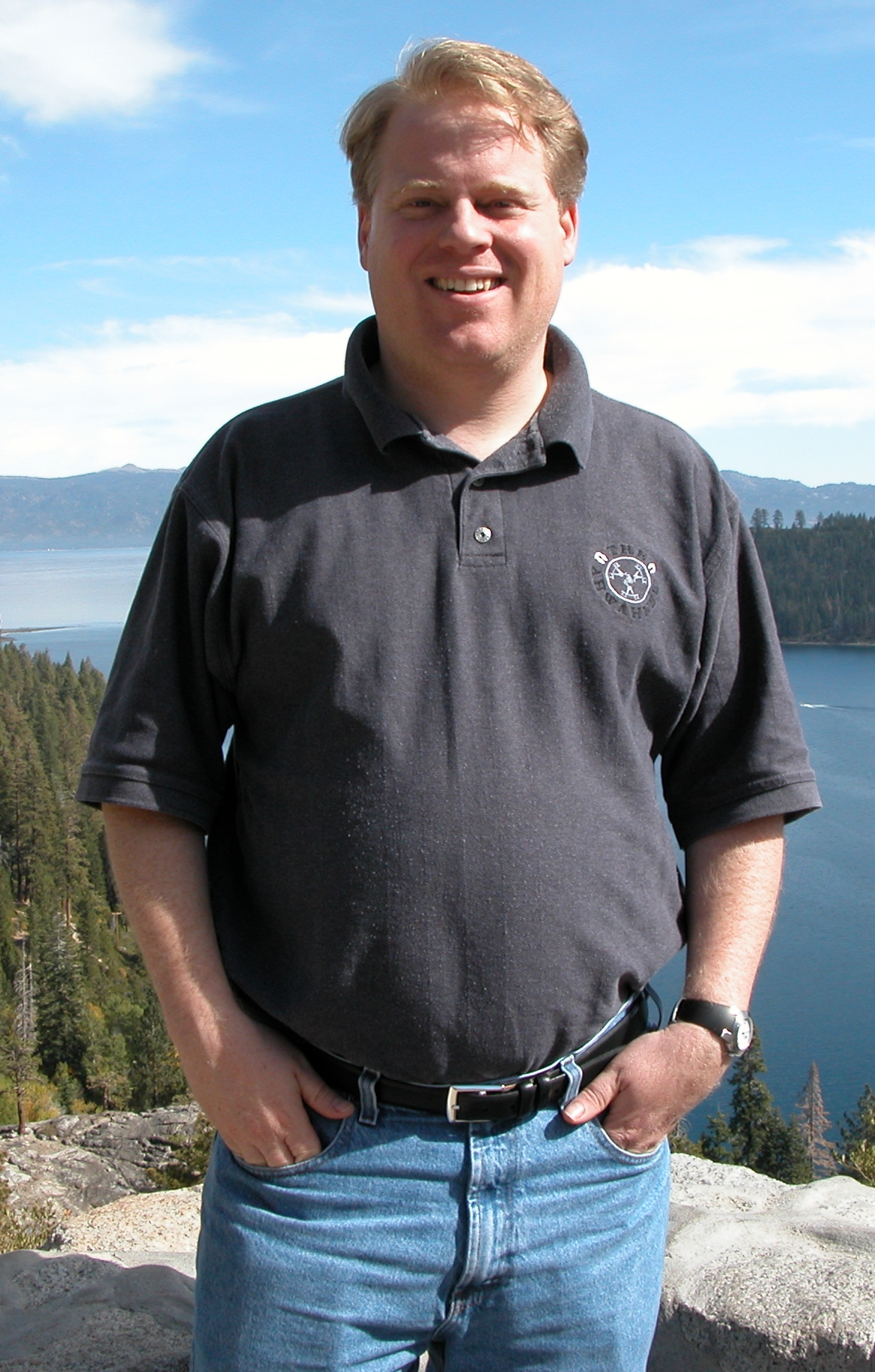
- Born: January 18, 1965 (age 61); Piscataway, New Jersey, U.S.
- Occupation: Author
- Known for: Blogging, Advocating Technology
- Spouse: Maryam Ghaemmaghami Scoble
- Children: 3

Robert Scoble (born January 18, 1965) is an American blogger, technical evangelist, and author. Scoble is best known for his blog, Scobleizer, which came to prominence during his tenure as a technology evangelist at Microsoft. He later worked for Fast Company as a video blogger, and then Rackspace and the Rackspace-sponsored community site Building 43 promoting breakthrough technology and startups.

== Early life and education ==
Scoble was born in New Jersey in 1965, and grew up about a kilometer from Apple Computer’s head office in Silicon Valley.

In 1993, he dropped out without finishing his degree in journalism from San Jose State University’s School of Journalism and Mass Communications.

== Career ==
=== Microsoft ===
In June 2003, Scoble accepted a position at Microsoft. The Economist described Scoble’s influence in its February 15, 2005 edition:

He has become a minor celebrity among geeks worldwide, who read his blog religiously. Impressively, he has also succeeded where small armies of more conventional public-relations types have been failing abjectly for years: he has made Microsoft, with its history of monopolistic bullying, appear marginally but noticeably less evil to the outside world, and especially to the independent software developers that are his core audience

On June 10, 2006, Scoble announced he was leaving Microsoft to join Podtech.net as vice president of media development with a higher salary accompanied by "a quite aggressive stock option" offer that would have made him wealthy if his new company had succeeded. According to Alexa Internet that day had the biggest traffic to his blog and PodTech over their lifetime. June 28, 2006 was his last day at Microsoft.

=== Fast Company ===
On December 11, 2007, while taking part in a panel discussion at the LeWeb3 Conference, he inadvertently leaked news (by loading up a post on TechCrunch) that he would be leaving PodTech on January 14, 2008, and was likely to join Fast Company. He acknowledged the news on his blog on December 12 but stated that he had not yet signed on with Fast Company. He did a video interview about his plans and leased studio space from Revision3.

On March 3, 2008, Scoble launched FastCompany.tv with two shows: FastCompany Live and ScobleizerTV. He characterizes the first as "a show done totally on cell phones." The second is similar to his previous show on PodTech, only with better equipment and a camera operator. The show is recorded with two cameras in 720p HD.

=== Rackspace and Building 43 ===
On March 14, 2009, Scoble announced via his blog and on the Gillmor Gang that he was joining Rackspace. As part of his work there, he teamed up with the company to develop Building 43, a new content and social networking website aimed to help grow new startups and promote groundbreaking technology. In 2012, Building 43 was re-branded as Small Teams, Big Impact.

Scoble left Rackspace to join UploadVR in 2016 as an entrepreneur in residence.

== Allegations of sexual harassment and assault ==
On October 20, 2017, the news outlet BuzzFeed published a story that alleges that in 2010, Scoble sexually assaulted Michelle Greer, his Rackspace coworker, and Quinn Norton, a technology journalist. Scoble apologized after the BuzzFeed article was published, saying that he has been working towards making amends ever since becoming sober two years ago. However, several women countered this claim, reporting that he made inappropriate advances during the time period he claimed to be sober. Days later, he deleted his apology, and proclaimed his innocence in a blog post that also announced his new company, LightPitch.

One immediate reaction was by the VR/AR Association (VRARA), stating: "In light of recent news and allegations of sexual harassment by Robert Scoble, the VR/AR Association has formally removed Robert from our Board of Advisors. Our organization does not condone harassment of any kind, and feel that this is the best course of action."

Scoble resigned from the Transformation Group, his AR consulting firm, which he co-founded in late 2016.

== Appearances ==
In November, 2013, Scoble was co-keynote speaker with Shel Israel at the 2013 Telstra Australian Digital Summit. Scoble and Israel talked to their book titled "Age of Context: Mobile, Sensors, Data and the Future of Privacy".

On April 1, 2008, The Register ran an April fool's spoof claiming Robert Scoble was actually an IBM bot.

On November 14, 2007, he was a contestant on a game show at NewTeeVee Live featuring other internet celebrities such as Veronica Belmont, Casey McKinnon, Cali Lewis, Kevin Rose, Justin Kan, and others.

On November 6, 2006, Scoble appeared as a panelist on a Chinese Software Professionals Association event called "The New Age of Influence: The Impact of Social Computing on Media and Marketing".

== Milliscoble ==
In September 2008, Follow cost, a website that calculated how annoying it would be to follow anyone on Twitter, invented the milliscoble unit of measurement defined as: "1/1000 of the average daily Twitter status updates by Robert Scoble as of 10:09 CST September 25, 2008." At that time, Scoble was averaging 21.21 tweets per day, so a milliscoble is 0.02121 tweets per day. A person with a milliscoble rating of 1000 will be as annoying to follow as Scoble.

== Personal life ==
He is married to Maryam Ghaemmaghami Scoble. Although he considers himself an agnostic, he converted to Islam at the time of the marriage. He has three sons, one who is autistic.

== Bibliography ==
- Scoble, Robert; Israel, Shel (January 2006). Naked Conversations: How Blogs are Changing the Way Businesses Talk with Customers. Wiley. ISBN 978-0-471-74719-2. "We live in a time when most people don't trust big companies."
- Scoble, Robert; Israel, Shel (September 2013). Age of Context: Mobile, Sensors, Data and the Future of Privacy. Creative Space. ISBN 978-1492348436.
- Scoble, Robert; Israel, Shel (November 2016). The Fourth Transformation: How Augmented Reality and Artificial Intelligence Change Everything. Patrick Brewster Press. ISBN 978-1-5398-9444-5.
- Cronin, Irena; Scoble, Robert (May 2020). The Infinite Retina. Packt Publishing. ISBN 9781838824044
