= List of courtesy titles in the peerages of Britain and Ireland =

This is a list of courtesy titles used for the heirs of currently extant titles in the Peerages of England, Scotland, Great Britain, Ireland, and the United Kingdom. Asterisks denote courtesy titles currently used by living heirs.

== Courtesy titles for heirs of dukes ==
Peer	Son	Grandson	Great-grandson
The Duke of Norfolk	Earl of Arundel*	Lord Maltravers	
The Duke of Somerset	Lord Seymour*		
The Duke of Richmond, Lennox and Gordon	Earl of March and Kinrara*	Lord Settrington	
The Duke of Grafton	Earl of Euston*	Viscount Ipswich	
The Duke of Beaufort	Marquess of Worcester*	Earl of Glamorgan*	Viscount Grosmont
The Duke of St Albans	Earl of Burford*	Lord Vere	
The Duke of Bedford	Marquess of Tavistock*	Lord Howland	
The Duke of Devonshire	Marquess of Hartington	Earl of Burlington*	Lord Cavendish*
The Duke of Marlborough	Marquess of Blandford*	Earl of Sunderland*	Lord Churchill
The Duke of Rutland	Marquess of Granby*	Lord Haddon	
The Duke of Hamilton and Brandon	Marquess of Douglas and Clydesdale*	Earl of Angus	Lord Abernethy
The Duke of Buccleuch and Queensberry	Earl of Dalkeith*	Lord Eskdaill*	
The Duke of Argyll	Marquess of Lorne*	Earl of Campbell	Viscount Lochaw
The Duke of Atholl	Marquess of Tullibardine*	Earl of Strathtay	Viscount Balquhidder
The Duke of Montrose	Marquess of Graham*	Earl of Kincardine	Viscount Dundaff
The Duke of Roxburghe	Marquess of Bowmont and Cessford*	Earl of Kelso	Viscount Broxmouth
The Duke of Manchester	Viscount Mandeville	Lord Kimbolton	
The Duke of Northumberland	Earl Percy*	Lord Lovaine	
The Duke of Leinster	Marquess of Kildare	Earl of Offaly	Viscount Leinster
The Duke of Wellington	Marquess of Douro*	Earl of Mornington*	Viscount Wellesley
The Duke of Sutherland	Marquess of Stafford*	Earl Gower	Viscount Trentham
The Duke of Abercorn	Marquess of Hamilton*	Viscount Strabane*	
The Duke of Westminster	Earl Grosvenor	Viscount Belgrave	
The Duke of Fife	Earl of Southesk*	Lord Carnegie	Master of Carnegie
The Duke of Gloucester	Earl of Ulster*	Lord Culloden*	
The Duke of Kent	Earl of St Andrews*	Lord Downpatrick*	
The Duke of York	Earl of Inverness	Lord Killyleagh	
The Duke of Cambridge	Earl of Strathearn	Lord Carrickfergus	
The Duke of Sussex	Earl of Dumbarton	Lord Kilkeel	
The Duke of Edinburgh	Earl of Wessex*	Viscount Severn	

== Courtesy titles for heirs of marquesses ==
Peer	Son	Grandson
The Marquess of Winchester	Earl of Wiltshire*	Lord St John
The Marquess of Huntly	Earl of Aboyne*	Lord Strathavon*
The Marquess of Queensberry	Viscount Drumlanrig	
The Marquess of Tweeddale	Earl of Gifford	Viscount Walden
The Marquess of Lothian	Earl of Ancram*	Lord Newbattle
The Marquess of Lansdowne	Earl of Kerry*/Shelburne	Viscount Calne & Calston*/Clanmaurice
The Marquess Townshend	Viscount Raynham*	
The Marquess of Salisbury	Viscount Cranborne*	
The Marquess of Bath	Viscount Weymouth*	
The Marquess of Hertford	Earl of Yarmouth*	Viscount Beauchamp*
The Marquess of Bute	Earl of Dumfries*	Viscount Mountjoy
The Marquess of Waterford	Earl of Tyrone*	Lord Le Poer
The Marquess of Downshire	Earl of Hillsborough*	Viscount Kilwarlin
The Marquess of Donegall	Earl of Belfast*	Viscount Chichester*
The Marquess of Headfort	Earl of Bective*	Lord Kenlis*
The Marquess of Sligo	Earl of Altamont*	Viscount Westport
The Marquess of Ely	Viscount Loftus	
The Marquess of Exeter	Lord Burghley*	
The Marquess of Northampton	Earl Compton*	Lord Wilmington*
The Marquess Camden	Earl of Brecknock*	Viscount Bayham
The Marquess of Anglesey	Earl of Uxbridge*	Lord Paget*
The Marquess of Cholmondeley	Earl of Rocksavage*	Viscount Malpas
The Marquess of Londonderry	Viscount Castlereagh	Lord Stewart
The Marquess Conyngham	Earl of Mount Charles*	Viscount Slane
The Marquess of Ailesbury	Earl of Cardigan*	Viscount Savernake
The Marquess of Bristol	Earl Jermyn*	Lord Hervey
The Marquess of Ailsa	Earl of Cassilis*	Lord Kennedy
The Marquess of Normanby	Earl of Mulgrave*	Lord Phipps
The Marquess of Abergavenny	Earl of Lewes	Viscount Nevill
The Marquess of Zetland	Earl of Ronaldshay	Lord Dundas
The Marquess of Linlithgow	Earl of Hopetoun*	Viscount Aithrie*
The Marquess of Aberdeen and Temair	Earl of Haddo*	Viscount Formartine
The Marquess of Milford Haven	Earl of Medina*	Viscount Alderney
The Marquess of Reading	Viscount Erleigh*	

== Courtesy titles for heirs of earls ==
Peer	Son	Grandson
The Earl of Shrewsbury, Waterford and Talbot	Viscount Ingestre*	
The Earl of Derby	Lord Stanley*	
The Earl of Huntingdon	Viscount Hastings	
The Earl of Pembroke and Montgomery	Lord Herbert*	
The Earl of Devon	Lord Courtenay*	
The Earl of Lincoln	Lord Fynes	
The Earl of Suffolk and Berkshire	Viscount Andover*	
The Earl of Denbigh and Desmond	Viscount Feilding*	
The Earl of Westmorland	Lord Burghersh	
The Earl of Lindsey and Abingdon	Lord Norreys*	
The Earl of Winchilsea and Nottingham	Viscount Maidstone*	
The Earl of Sandwich	Viscount Hinchingbrooke*	
The Earl of Essex	Viscount Malden	
The Earl of Carlisle	Viscount Morpeth	
The Earl of Shaftesbury	Lord Ashley*	
The Earl of Portland	Viscount Woodstock*	
The Earl of Scarbrough	Viscount Lumley	
The Earl of Albemarle	Viscount Bury*	
The Earl of Coventry	Viscount Deerhurst	
The Earl of Jersey	Viscount Villiers*/Grandison	
The Earl of Crawford and Balcarres	Lord Balniel*	Master of Lindsay*
The Earl of Erroll	Lord Hay*	
The Earl of Sutherland	Lord Strathnaver	Master of Strathnaver
The Earl of Mar	Lord Garioch	
The Earl of Rothes	Lord Leslie	
The Earl of Morton	Lord Aberdour*	Master of Aberdour
The Earl of Buchan	Lord Cardross*	Master of Cardross
The Earl of Eglinton and Winton	Lord Montgomerie*	Master of Montgomerie
The Earl of Caithness	Lord Berriedale*	
The Earl of Mar and Kellie	Viscount Fentoun	
The Earl of Moray	Lord Doune*	Master of Doune
The Earl of Home	Lord Dunglass	
The Earl of Perth	Viscount Strathallan	
The Earl of Strathmore and Kinghorne	Lord Glamis	Master of Glamis
The Earl of Haddington	Lord Binning	
The Earl of Galloway	Lord Garlies*	
The Earl of Lauderdale	Viscount Maitland*	
The Earl of Lindsay	Viscount Garnock*	Master of Garnock*
The Earl of Loudoun	Lord Mauchline	
The Earl of Kinnoull	Viscount Dupplin*	
The Earl of Elgin and Kincardine	Lord Bruce*	Master of Bruce*
The Earl of Wemyss and March	Lord Elcho/Neidpath*	
The Earl of Dalhousie	Lord Ramsay*	
The Earl of Airlie	Lord Ogilvy*	Master of Ogilvy
The Earl of Leven and Melville	Lord Balgonie	
The Earl of Dysart	Lord Huntingtower*	Master of Huntingtower*
The Earl of Selkirk	Lord Daer	
The Earl of Northesk	Lord Rosehill	
The Earl of Dundee	Lord Scrymgeour*	Master of Scrymgeour*
The Earl of Newburgh	Viscount Kynnaird	
The Earl of Annandale and Hartfell	Lord Johnstone*	Master of Johnstone*
The Earl of Dundonald	Lord Cochrane*	
The Earl of Kintore	Lord Inverurie*	
The Earl of Dunmore	Viscount Fincastle	
The Earl of Orkney	Viscount Kirkwall*	
The Earl of Seafield	Viscount Reidhaven*	
The Earl of Stair	Viscount Dalrymple*	
The Earl of Rosebery and Midlothian	Lord Primrose/Dalmeny*	Master of Dalmeny
The Earl of Glasgow	Viscount Kelburn*	
The Earl Ferrers	Viscount Tamworth*	
The Earl of Dartmouth	Viscount Lewisham	
The Earl of Tankerville	Lord Ossulston	
The Earl of Aylesford	Lord Guernsey*	
The Earl of Macclesfield	Viscount Parker	
The Earl Waldegrave	Viscount Chewton*	
The Earl of Harrington	Viscount Petersham*	
The Earl of Portsmouth	Viscount Lymington*	
The Earl of Warwick and Brooke	Lord Brooke*	
The Earl of Buckinghamshire	Lord Hobart	
The Earl of Guilford	Lord North*	
The Earl of Hardwicke	Viscount Royston*	
The Earl of Ilchester	Lord Stavordale	
The Earl De La Warr	Lord Buckhurst*	
The Earl of Radnor	Viscount Folkestone*	
The Earl Spencer	Viscount Althorp*	
The Earl Bathurst	Lord Apsley*	
The Earl of Clarendon	Lord Hyde*	
The Earl of Mansfield and Mansfield	Viscount Stormont*	Master of Stormont
The Earl of Mount Edgcumbe	Viscount Valletort*	
The Earl Fortescue	Viscount Ebrington	
The Earl of Carnarvon	Lord Porchester*	
The Earl Cadogan	Viscount Chelsea*	
The Earl of Malmesbury	Viscount FitzHarris*	
The Earl of Cork and Orrery	Viscount Dungarvan*	
The Earl of Westmeath	Lord Delvin*	
The Earl of Meath	Lord Ardee*	
The Earl of Drogheda	Viscount Moore*	
The Earl of Granard	Viscount Forbes*	
The Earl of Darnley	Lord Clifton*	
The Earl of Bessborough	Viscount Duncannon*	
The Earl of Carrick	Viscount Ikerrin	
The Earl of Shannon	Viscount Boyle	
The Earl of Arran	Viscount Sudley	
The Earl of Courtown	Viscount Stopford*	
The Earl of Mexborough	Viscount Pollington*	
The Earl Winterton	Viscount Turnour	
The Earl of Kingston	Viscount Kingsborough*	
The Earl of Roden	Viscount Jocelyn*	
The Earl of Lisburne	Viscount Vaughan	
The Earl of Clanwilliam	Lord Gillford*	
The Earl of Antrim	Viscount Dunluce*	
The Earl of Longford	Lord Silchester*	
The Earl of Portarlington	Viscount Carlow*	
The Earl of Mayo	Lord Naas*	
The Earl Annesley	Viscount Glerawly*	
The Earl of Enniskillen	Viscount Cole	
The Earl Erne	Viscount Crichton	
The Earl of Lucan	Lord Bingham*	
The Earl Belmore	Viscount Corry*	
The Earl Castle Stewart	Viscount Stuart	
The Earl of Donoughmore	Viscount Suirdale*	
The Earl of Caledon	Viscount Alexander*	
The Earl of Rosslyn	Lord Loughborough*	
The Earl of Craven	Viscount Uffington	
The Earl of Onslow	Viscount Cranley	
The Earl of Romney	Viscount Marsham*	
The Earl of Chichester	Lord Pelham	
The Earl of Wilton	Viscount Grey de Wilton*	
The Earl of Limerick	Viscount Glentworth*	
The Earl of Clancarty	Viscount Dunlo	
The Earl of Powis	Viscount Clive*	
The Earl Nelson	Viscount Merton*	
The Earl of Gosford	Viscount Acheson	
The Earl of Rosse	Lord Oxmantown*	
The Earl of Normanton	Viscount Somerton*	
The Earl Grey	Viscount Howick	
The Earl of Lonsdale	Viscount Lowther	
The Earl of Harrowby	Viscount Sandon*	
The Earl of Harewood	Viscount Lascelles*	
The Earl of Minto	Viscount Melgund*	
The Earl Cathcart	Lord Greenock*	
The Earl of Verulam	Viscount Grimston*	
The Earl of St Germans	Lord Eliot	
The Earl of Morley	Viscount Boringdon	
The Earl of Bradford	Viscount Newport*	
The Earl of Eldon	Viscount Encombe*	
The Earl Howe	Viscount Curzon*	
The Earl of Stradbroke	Viscount Dunwich*	
The Earl Temple of Stowe	Lord Langton	
The Earl of Kilmorey	Viscount Newry and Mourne*	
The Earl of Listowel	Viscount Ennismore	
The Earl of Norbury	Viscount Glandine	
The Earl Cawdor	Viscount Emlyn*	
The Earl of Ranfurly	Viscount Northland*	
The Earl of Lichfield	Viscount Anson*	
The Earl of Durham	Viscount Lambton*	
The Earl Granville	Lord Leveson*	
The Earl of Effingham	Lord Howard of Effingham*	
The Earl of Ducie	Lord Moreton*	
The Earl of Yarborough	Lord Worsley*	
The Earl of Leicester	Viscount Coke*	
The Earl of Gainsborough	Viscount Campden*	
The Earl of Strafford	Viscount Enfield*	
The Earl of Cottenham	Viscount Crowhurst*	
The Earl Cowley	Viscount Dangan*	
The Earl of Dudley	Viscount Ednam	
The Earl Russell	Viscount Amberley	
The Earl of Cromartie	Viscount Tarbat*	
The Earl of Kimberley	Lord Wodehouse*	
The Earl of Wharncliffe	Viscount Carlton*	
The Earl Cairns	Viscount Garmoyle*	
The Earl of Lytton	Viscount Knebworth*	
The Earl of Selborne	Viscount Wolmer*	
The Earl of Iddesleigh	Viscount St Cyres*	
The Earl of Cranbrook	Lord Medway	
The Earl of Cromer	Viscount Errington*	
The Earl of Plymouth	Viscount Windsor*	
The Earl of Liverpool	Viscount Hawkesbury*	
The Earl St Aldwyn	Viscount Quenington	
The Earl Beatty	Viscount Borodale*	
The Earl Haig	Viscount Dawick	
The Earl of Iveagh	Viscount Elveden*	
The Earl of Balfour	Viscount Traprain	
The Earl of Oxford and Asquith	Viscount Asquith*	
The Earl Jellicoe	Viscount Brocas	
The Earl of Inchcape	Viscount Glenapp*	
The Earl Peel	Viscount Clanfield*	
The Earl Baldwin of Bewdley	Viscount Corvedale	
The Earl of Halifax	Lord Irwin*	
The Earl of Gowrie	Viscount Ruthven of Canberra*	
The Earl Lloyd George of Dwyfor	Viscount Gwynedd*	
The Earl Mountbatten of Burma	Lord Brabourne*	
The Earl Alexander of Tunis	Lord Rideau	
The Earl of Swinton	Lord Masham*	
The Earl Attlee	Viscount Prestwood	
The Earl of Woolton	Viscount Walberton	
The Earl of Snowdon	Viscount Linley*	
The Earl of Stockton	Viscount Macmillan of Ovenden*	

== See also ==
- Peerages in the United Kingdom
- List of dukes in the peerages of Britain and Ireland
- List of marquesses in the peerages of Britain and Ireland
- List of earls
