= Lady Louise Windsor =

Member of the British royal family (born 2003)

Lady Louise Mountbatten-Windsor
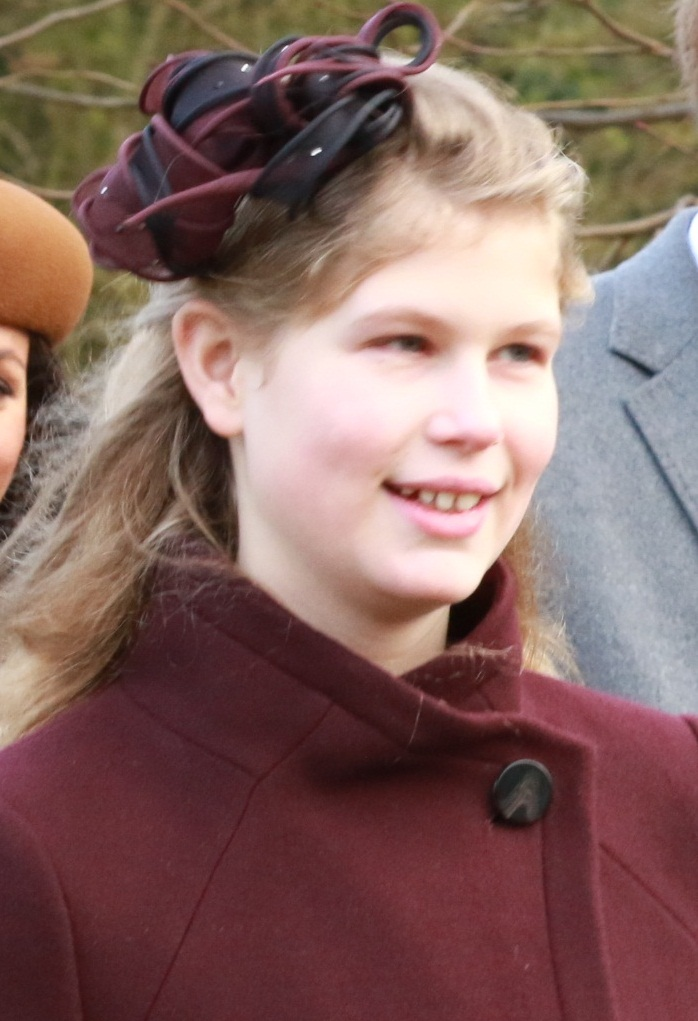
- Louise in 2017
- Born: Lady Louise Alice Elizabeth Mary Mountbatten-Windsor; 8 November 2003 (age 22); Frimley Park Hospital, Surrey, England
- Education: University of St Andrews
- Parents: Prince Edward, Duke of Edinburgh (father); Sophie Rhys-Jones (mother)
- Family: House of Windsor

Lady Louise Alice Elizabeth Mary Mountbatten-Windsor (born 8 November 2003) is a member of the British royal family. She is the elder child and only daughter of Prince Edward, Duke of Edinburgh, and Sophie, Duchess of Edinburgh. Louise is the youngest niece of King Charles III. She was born during the reign of her paternal grandmother, Queen Elizabeth II, and at the time of her birth was eighth in the line of succession to the British throne; as of 2026, she is 18th.

== Early life ==
Lady Louise Alice Elizabeth Mary Mountbatten-Windsor was born prematurely at 11:32 pm on 8 November 2003 at Frimley Park Hospital, Surrey. Her mother, Sophie, then Countess of Wessex, had been taken there by ambulance from the family home at Bagshot Park. Her father, Prince Edward, then Earl of Wessex, and the youngest child of Queen Elizabeth II and Prince Philip, was not present for the birth, which occurred suddenly while he was on an official visit to Mauritius. She has a younger brother, James, born in 2007.

Louise was delivered by emergency Caesarean section due to a placental abruption that caused significant blood loss to both mother and child. She was transferred to the neo-natal unit at St George's Hospital, Tooting, London, while her mother remained at Frimley Park. Louise returned to Frimley Park on 13 November and was discharged on 23 November, four days after her mother. Her name, Louise Alice Elizabeth Mary, was announced on 26 November.

She was baptised in the Private Chapel at Windsor Castle on 24 April 2004 by David Conner, the Dean of Windsor. Her godparents are Lady Sarah Chatto, Lord Ivar Mountbatten, Lady Alexandra Etherington, Francesca Schwarzenbach, and Rupert Elliott. Louise was the last child to wear the original royal christening gown.

Louise was born with esotropia and underwent an operation in 2006 in an unsuccessful attempt to correct the condition. Further treatment in late 2013 was successful.

=== Education ===
Louise attended St George's School, Windsor Castle, before moving to St Mary's School Ascot in 2017 from Year 9. She chose English, history, politics and drama as her A-Level subjects. While at school, she took part in The Duke of Edinburgh's Award and received her gold award from her father in 2026. After completing her A-Levels, she enrolled at the University of St Andrews in Fife in 2022 to study English. During her time at university, she worked part-time in a canteen and was involved in student theatre productions. She later added international relations to her degree and graduated with an undergraduate Master of Arts in English and International Relations in July 2026. She reportedly plans to take a gap year to work, volunteer and travel after graduation.

=== Military training ===
In 2024, Louise joined the British Army's University Officers' Training Corps (UOTC) unit, Tayforth UOTC, an Army Reserve formation made up of students from the University of St Andrews and other institutions in the surrounding region. As of 2025, she holds the rank of Officer Cadet in the Army Reserve.

== Official appearances ==
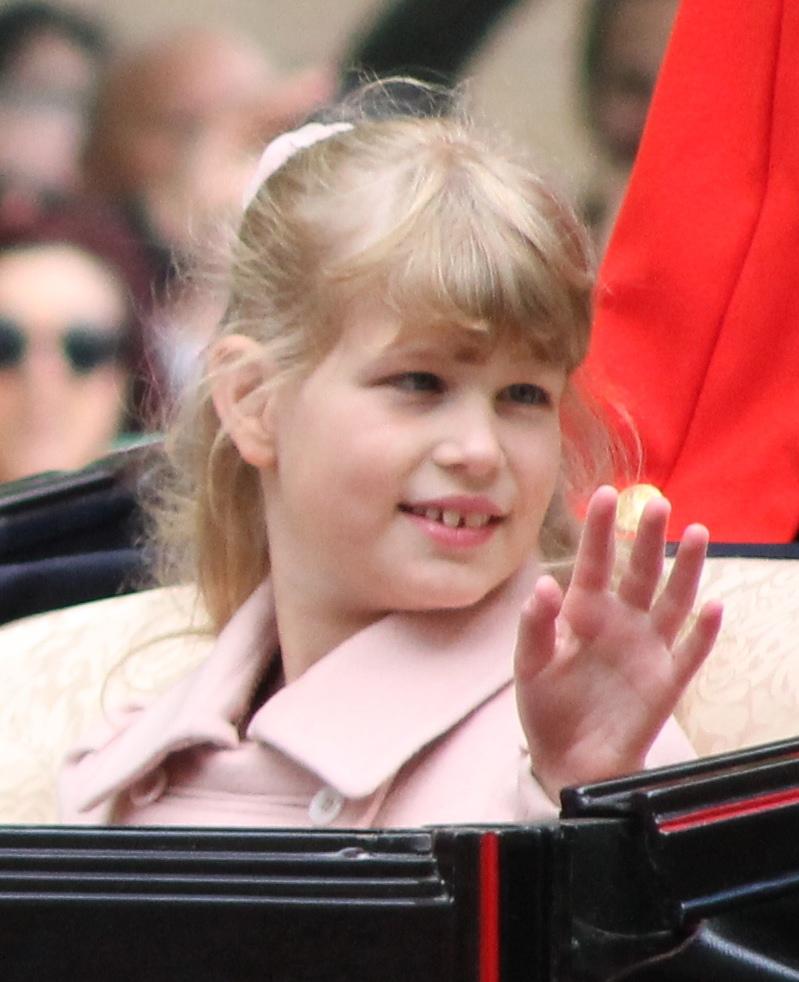
Louise riding in a carriage at Trooping the Colour, June 2013

In 2011, Louise was a bridesmaid at the wedding of Prince William and Catherine Middleton.

In August 2018, she accompanied her mother, patron of UK Sail Training, to Haslar Marina in Portsmouth Harbour to meet a group of young girls working towards earning their qualification on an entry-level course of the Royal Yachting Association. Later that month, mother and daughter attended the final of the Hockey Women's World Cup in London; the Duchess is the patron of England Hockey. To celebrate Louise's 15th birthday in November 2018, they made a cameo appearance on Strictly Come Dancing, watching the BBC programme from the audience. In December, Louise joined her mother at the International Horse Show at Olympia, London.

In September 2020, she participated in the Great British Beach Clean with her family at Southsea Beach, in support of the Marine Conservation Society.

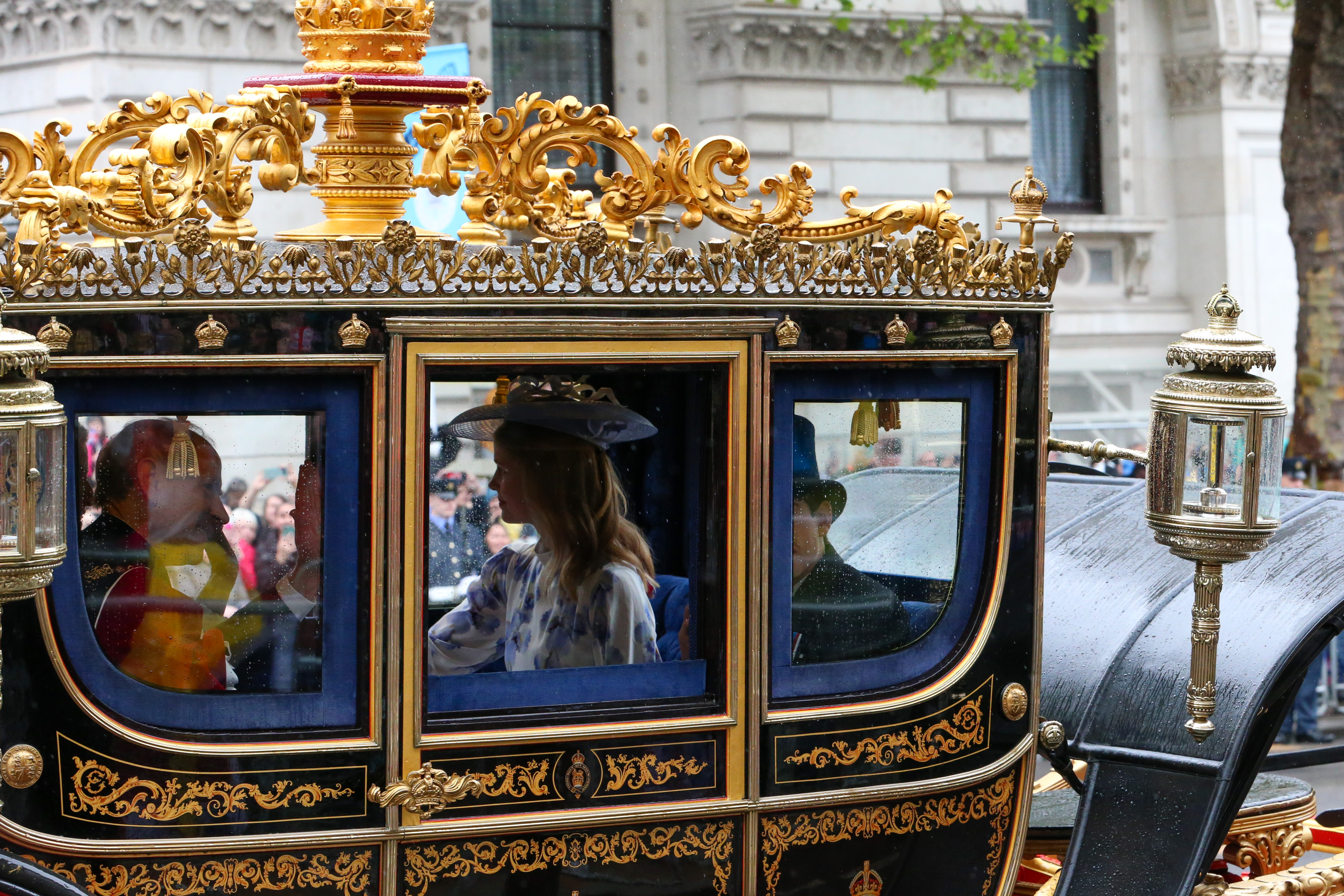
Louise at the coronation of Charles III and Camilla in 2023

Following the death of her grandfather, Prince Philip, Louise accompanied her parents to a church service at the Royal Chapel of All Saints on 11 April 2021. She also attended his funeral on 17 April. In March 2022, she was present at his memorial service. She attended Trooping the Colour in June, where she joined her family on the balcony; the Platinum Jubilee National Service of Thanksgiving; and the Platinum Party at the Palace. Following the death of her grandmother, Queen Elizabeth II, on 8 September 2022, Louise stood vigil for 15 minutes at the Queen's coffin at Westminster Hall with her brother James and six cousins on 17 September. On 19 September, she joined other family members at the state funeral.

On 6 May 2023, Louise attended the coronation of King Charles III and Queen Camilla. On 7 May, she attended the Coronation Concert at Windsor Castle.

== Personal life ==
As of 2026, Louise is reported to be dating Felix da Silva-Clamp, whom she met during her studies at the University of St Andrews.

=== Interests ===
Louise is a member of Girlguiding, of which her grandmother was patron and her mother is president. Her mother was a Brownie and a Guide when she was a child.

Louise was taught to ride at an early age, and joined her father on horseback during the Queen's 90th birthday celebrations in Windsor in 2016. She has taken up carriage driving, a sport popularised in Britain by her grandfather, Prince Philip. In May 2017, she was responsible for leading the carriages of the Champagne Laurent-Perrier Meet of the British Driving Society at the Royal Windsor Horse Show. In May 2019, Louise took part in the Private Driving Singles carriage drive at the Royal Windsor Horse Show and achieved third place. She inherited her grandfather's driving ponies and carriage in April 2021. In 2022, she drove one of his carriages in front of the Queen at the Royal Windsor Horse Show.

In August 2022, it was reported that Louise had been working at a garden centre over the summer. In May 2026, she worked as a chief organiser at the Royal Windsor Horse Show, operating a first concierge service. In the summer of 2026, she reportedly worked as a cook for guests staying in lodges at Balmoral, which her uncle, King Charles III, rents out.

== Titles, styles, and honours ==
=== Titles and styles ===
Louise is styled as "Lady Louise Mountbatten-Windsor", although at the time of her birth the palace also used the style "Lady Louise Windsor" in some of its announcements. She would otherwise be a princess of the United Kingdom (Princess Louise of Wessex, now Princess Louise of Edinburgh) under the terms of the 1917 letters patent, which assigned princely status and the style of Royal Highness to all children of a monarch's sons. However, when her parents married, Elizabeth II announced via a Buckingham Palace press release that their children would be styled as the children of an earl rather than as prince or princess. In 2020, her mother reaffirmed that Louise and her brother retained the right to use their royal titles and styles, and could choose to do so as adults, although as of 2026 neither has chosen to do so.

=== Honours ===
In June 2008, to recognise a visit by Louise's father to the Canadian province of Manitoba, a lake in the north of the province was named Lake Louise. Her brother was similarly honoured by Lake James in the same province.

Lady Louise Windsor House of Windsor Born: 8 November 2003
Lines of succession
Preceded by Earl of Wessex	Succession to the British throne 18th in line	Followed by The Princess Royal
Orders of precedence in the United Kingdom
Preceded by Princess Eugenie	Ladies; Lady Louise Mountbatten-Windsor	Followed by Zara Tindall
