= James, Earl of Wessex =

Member of the British royal family (born 2007)

Earl of Wessex
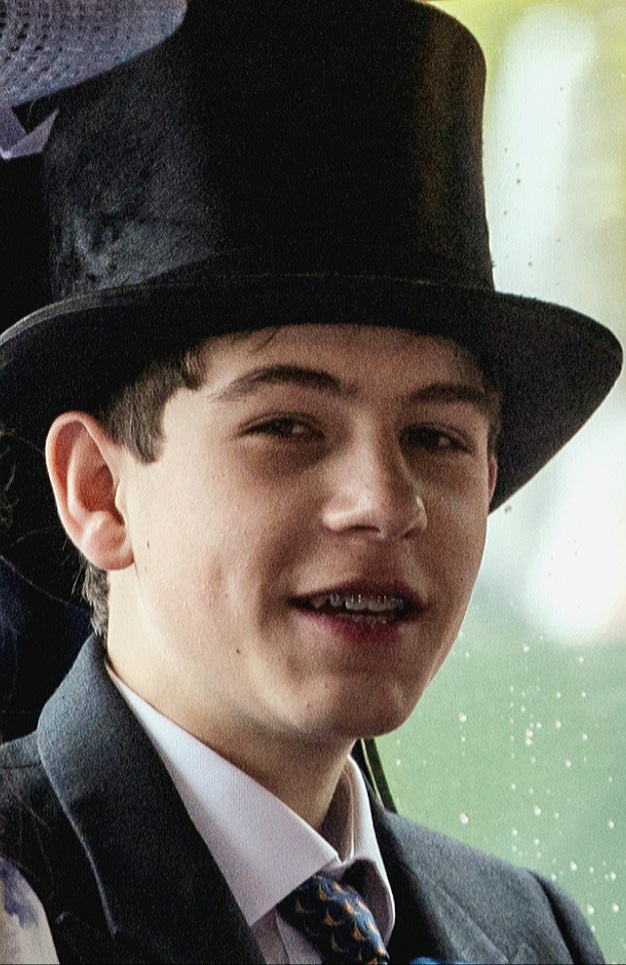
- James at the coronation of Charles III in 2023
- Born: James Alexander Philip Theo Mountbatten-Windsor, Viscount Severn; 17 December 2007 (age 18); Frimley Park Hospital, Surrey, England
- Education: Royal Agricultural University
- Parents: Prince Edward, Duke of Edinburgh (father); Sophie Rhys-Jones (mother)
- Family: House of Windsor

James Alexander Philip Theo Mountbatten-Windsor, Earl of Wessex (born 17 December 2007), styled Viscount Severn until 2023, is a member of the British royal family. He is the younger child and only son of Prince Edward, Duke of Edinburgh, and Sophie, Duchess of Edinburgh.

James is the youngest grandchild of Queen Elizabeth II and Prince Philip, Duke of Edinburgh, and a nephew of King Charles III. He was born during the reign of his paternal grandmother and was eighth in the line of succession to the British throne at the time of his birth; as of 2026, he is 17th.

== Early life and education ==
James Alexander Philip Theo Mountbatten-Windsor, Viscount Severn was born at 4:20 pm on 17 December 2007 by caesarean section at Frimley Park Hospital, Surrey, the younger child and only son of Prince Edward, Earl of Wessex, and Sophie, Countess of Wessex (later the Duke and Duchess of Edinburgh). His father is the youngest child of Queen Elizabeth II and Prince Philip, Duke of Edinburgh. His mother worked in public relations before becoming a full-time member of the royal family following her marriage in 1999. His full name was announced on 21 December. He has an older sister, Louise.

James was baptised on 19 April 2008 in the private chapel at Windsor Castle by David Conner, Dean of Windsor. His godparents were Alastair Bruce, Duncan Bullivant, Thomas Hill, Denise Poulton, Jeanye Irwin, and the ceremony was attended by his paternal grandparents, Elizabeth II and Prince Philip.

James attended Eagle House School, a coeducational preparatory school near Sandhurst, Berkshire, from 2011 to 2021, then went on to Radley College in Oxfordshire, completing his studies there in 2026. In August 2026, it was announced that he would attend the Royal Agricultural University to study Rural Land and Property Management.

== Official appearances ==
James made his first official appearance in the carriage procession at Trooping the Colour in 2016, and also took part in the 2022 Trooping the Colour.

In September 2020, he joined his parents in supporting the Marine Conservation Society by taking part in the Great British Beach Clean at Southsea Beach in Hampshire.

Following the thanksgiving memorial service for his grandfather Prince Philip on 29 March 2022, James attended the Platinum Jubilee National Service of Thanksgiving and the Platinum Party at the Palace in June 2022.

On 17 September 2022, during the period of official mourning for his grandmother Queen Elizabeth II, James joined his sister Louise and six cousins in mounting a 15-minute vigil around the Queen's coffin as it lay in state at Westminster Hall. On 19 September, he joined other family members at the state funeral.

On 6 May 2023, James, who then held the courtesy title Earl of Wessex, attended his uncle Charles III's coronation at Westminster Abbey, together with the rest of the royal family. The following day, he attended the Coronation Concert at Windsor Castle.

On 31 March 2024, James attended the Easter Matins Service at St. George's Chapel, Windsor Castle, with his mother and father. He was the only member of the younger generation of royals present.

== Titles, styles, and honours ==
=== Titles and styles ===
The title Viscount Severn alludes to the Welsh ancestry of his mother's family. James was accorded this courtesy title at birth as heir apparent to his father's earldom.

At birth, James automatically became a prince of the United Kingdom (Prince James of Wessex, now Prince James of Edinburgh) under the terms of the 1917 letters patent, which assigned princely status and the style of Royal Highness to all male-line grandchildren of a sovereign. However, when his parents married, Buckingham Palace announced that their children would be styled as the children of an earl rather than as prince or princess. In 2020, James's mother reaffirmed that he and his sister retained the right to use their royal titles and styles, and could choose to do so as adults, although as of 2026 neither has chosen to do so.

When his father was created Duke of Edinburgh in March 2023, James became styled by courtesy as Earl of Wessex, the family's senior subsidiary title. The Dukedom of Edinburgh, having been created as a life peerage, will become extinct upon his father's death, but James remains heir apparent to his father's hereditary peerages of Earl of Wessex, Earl of Forfar, and Viscount Severn.

=== Honours and decorations ===
- 6 February 2012: Queen Elizabeth II Diamond Jubilee Medal
- 6 February 2022: Queen Elizabeth II Platinum Jubilee Medal

In June 2008, to recognise Prince Edward's visit to the Canadian province of Manitoba, a lake in the north of the province was named Lake James. James's sister was similarly honoured by Lake Louise in the same province.

== See also ==
- List of courtesy titles in the peerages of Britain and Ireland

James, Earl of Wessex House of Windsor Born: 17 December 2007
Lines of succession
Preceded by The Duke of Edinburgh	Line of succession to the British throne 17th in line	Followed by Lady Louise Mountbatten-Windsor
Orders of precedence in the United Kingdom
Preceded by The Duke of Edinburgh	Gentlemen; Earl of Wessex	Followed by Peter Phillips
