= Lake Louise (Manitoba) =

Lake in Manitoba, Canada

Coordinates: 49°01′54″N 97°13′46″W

Lake Louise is a shallow perennial lake near Emerson, Manitoba, in Canada. It is up to 2.4 metres (7.9 ft) deep.

== History ==
The lake was named after Lady Louise Mountbatten-Windsor when her father Prince Edward visited the province's capital, Winnipeg, in June 2008.

Instead of a traditional gift usually given at events, two lakes in the province, this lake and Lake James, were named in honour of the prince's two children, Lady Louise Windsor and James, Earl of Wessex.

== See also ==
- List of lakes of Manitoba
- Lake James (Manitoba)
