= Lake James (Manitoba) =

Lake in Manitoba, Canada

- Location of the lake in Manitoba Lake James (Canada)
- Location: Manitoba
- Coordinates: 49°2′25″N 100°6′45″W
- Lake type: Glacial Lake
- Primary inflows: None
- Basin countries: Canada
- Max. length: 5.4 km (3.4 mi)
- Max. width: 2 km (1.2 mi)
- Shore length^{1}: 26 km (16 mi)
- Surface elevation: 301 m (988 ft)
- ^{1} Shore length is not a well-defined measure.

Lake James is a lake located in Manitoba, Canada.

== History ==
It was named after James, Viscount Severn (now Earl of Wessex by courtesy) when his father Prince Edward visited the province's capital Winnipeg in June 2008.

Instead of a traditional gift usually given at events, two lakes in the province were named in honour of two children, James and Lake Louise after Louise.

== See also ==
- List of lakes of Manitoba
- Lake Louise (Manitoba)
