= Vigil of the Princes =

British royal ceremony

The Vigil of the Princes refers to occasions when members of the British royal family have "stood guard" during the lying in state of one of their relatives during or as part of a British state or ceremonial funeral. This occurred for King George V in 1936, Queen Mary in 1953, Queen Elizabeth the Queen Mother in 2002, and for Queen Elizabeth II in 2022. Prior to 2022, only male members of the British royal family joined the vigil. In 2022 however, female members of the royal family took part in the vigil. Anne, Princess Royal, took part alongside her three brothers in both vigils for their mother, Queen Elizabeth II, while all four of the Queen's granddaughters took part in a separate grandchildren's vigil.

== List ==
Year	Date	Funeral	Participants	Relationship
1936	28 January	King George V	King Edward VIII, the Duke of York, the Duke of Gloucester, and the Duke of Kent	Sons
1953	29 March	Queen Mary	The Duke of Windsor and the Duke of Gloucester	Sons
2002	8 April	Queen Elizabeth the Queen Mother	The Prince of Wales, the Duke of York, the Earl of Wessex, and Viscount Linley	Grandsons
2022	12 September	Queen Elizabeth II	King Charles III, the Princess Royal, the Duke of York, and the Earl of Wessex and Forfar	Children
2022	16 September	Queen Elizabeth II	King Charles III, the Princess Royal, the Duke of York, and the Earl of Wessex and Forfar	Children
2022	17 September	Queen Elizabeth II	The Prince of Wales, the Duke of Sussex, Peter Phillips, Zara Tindall, Princess Beatrice, Princess Eugenie, Lady Louise Mountbatten-Windsor, and Viscount Severn	Grandchildren

== King George V ==
King Edward VIII; Prince Albert, Duke of York; Prince Henry, Duke of Gloucester; and Prince George, Duke of Kent, took guard at the lying-in-state of their father King George V on 27 January 1936. (A fifth son, Prince John, had predeceased his father in 1919.) The vigil took place after Westminster Hall was closed to the public for the evening.

No photographic record of this event is known and public viewing of the vigil was prohibited, though an oil painting made of it later by Frank Beresford was the official painting of the King's lying-in-state; it was exhibited for the first time at the Royal Academy exhibition of 1936 at Burlington House. The painting, named The Princes' Vigil: 12.15 am, January 28, 1936, was subsequently purchased by George V's widow Queen Mary to give to their son Edward VIII on his birthday. In the painting, the King is depicted wearing the uniform of the Welsh Guards, of whom he was the Colonel-in-Chief, the Duke of Gloucester wears the full dress uniform of the 10th Royal Hussars (the regiment in which he served), while the Duke of Kent is in Ceremonial Day Dress uniform of the Royal Navy. The Duke of York is not seen fully in the painting, although at the end of the catafalque opposite the King is a figure in full Foot Guards uniform; at this point in time, the Duke of York served as Colonel of the Regiment of the Scots Guards.

== Queen Mary ==
In 1953, the two surviving sons of Queen Mary, Prince Edward, Duke of Windsor (formerly King Edward VIII) and Prince Henry, Duke of Gloucester, took turn in standing vigil at their mother's coffin.

== Queen Elizabeth the Queen Mother ==
At 16:40 UTC on 8 April 2002, Charles, Prince of Wales; Prince Andrew, Duke of York; Prince Edward, Earl of Wessex; and Viscount Linley, took guard at the lying-in-state of their grandmother, Queen Elizabeth the Queen Mother. (Note: Also present were the sons of the Prince of Wales: Prince William and Prince Harry) The four relieved the guard of the Royal Company of Archers, and were themselves relieved by the Yeomen of the Guard after their 20-minute vigil. Both the Prince of Wales and the Duke of York wore naval uniform, while the Earl of Wessex and Viscount Linley wore black morning dress; the Earl of Wessex joined the Royal Marines, but chose to leave before completing basic training, while Lord Linley has never served in the forces.

== Queen Elizabeth II ==
The Duke of York, standing guard during the Vigil of the Princes, 16 September 2022

Queen Elizabeth II had four children: King Charles III; Anne, Princess Royal; Prince Andrew, Duke of York; and Prince Edward, Earl of Wessex and Forfar, as well as four grandsons and four granddaughters. The official plan for the Queen's funeral, Operation London Bridge, called for the Queen's children to stand vigil over their mother's coffin, as well as for the grandsons and granddaughters to do the same in another ceremony and separate time. During the return of the Queen's coffin to London from Scotland, a 24-hour "lying-at-rest" was undertaken at St Giles' Cathedral in Edinburgh, during which a permanent guard was provided by the Royal Company of Archers, The King's Bodyguard for Scotland. At 19:40 BST on 12 September 2022, the detachment of four members of the Royal Company were joined by the King, the Princess Royal, the Duke of York and the Earl of Wessex and Forfar, who stood vigil over the coffin for ten minutes. (Note: Also present were the spouses of the late Queen's children: the Queen Consort, the Countess of Wessex and Forfar, and Sir Timothy Laurence; as well as the late Queen's first cousin, the Duke of Gloucester.) The King wore a kilt made from the Royal Stewart tartan, the Princess Royal wore the full dress uniform of the Royal Navy, the Earl of Wessex and Forfar wore the No.1 dress uniform of the Royal Wessex Yeomanry, of which he is the Royal Honorary Colonel, and the Duke of York wore black morning dress with medals. The Princess Royal made history as the first woman to participate in the ceremony.

As part of the late Queen's lying-in-state in London, at 19:47 BST on 16 September 2022, her four children stood vigil for the second time. (Note: Also present were the spouses of the late Queen's children: the Queen Consort, the Countess of Wessex and Forfar, and Sir Timothy Laurence; as well as six of the Queen's grandchildren and their spouses, two of her great-grandchildren, and her four surviving paternal cousins.) All were in military uniform, with the King and the Duke of York both wearing ceremonial day dress of the Royal Navy, the Princess Royal wearing the full dress uniform, including the staff of a Gold Stick, of the Blues and Royals, of which she is the Colonel of the Regiment, and the Earl of Wessex and Forfar once again wearing the No.1 dress uniform of the Royal Wessex Yeomanry.

The following day at 18:00 BST, her eight grandchildren, William, Prince of Wales; Prince Harry, Duke of Sussex; Peter Phillips; Zara Tindall; Princess Beatrice; Princess Eugenie; Lady Louise Mountbatten-Windsor; and James, Viscount Severn, stood vigil over their grandmother's coffin. (Note: Also present were the Earl and Countess of Wessex and Forfar.) At King Charles III's request, both the Prince of Wales and the Duke of Sussex were in uniform, with both wearing the No.1 dress of the Blues and Royals while Peter Phillips and Viscount Severn each wore black morning dress with medals and the women wore dark formal dresses.

Unlike the vigil that occurred in 2002, the royal family did not relieve any of the guards standing at attention at the Queen's coffin. At each vigil, the royal family took sides of the coffin, while the guards on duty remained in place at the corners and members of the royal family standing one step above the guards. Each vigil lasted 15 minutes or less, while the Changing of the Guard occurred every twenty minutes.

== See also ==
- Vigil guard
