= House of Lords Precedence Act 1539 =

Act of the Parliament of England

House of Lords Precedence Act 1539 (Note: The citation of this act by this short title was authorised by section 5 of, and the second schedule to, the Statute Law Revision Act 1948. Due to the repeal of those provisions, it is now authorised by section 19(2) of the Interpretation Act 1978.)
- Act of Parliament
- Parliament of England
- Long title: An Acte for the placing of the Lordes in the Parliament. (Note: These words are printed against this act in the second column of the second schedule to the Statute Law Revision Act 1948, which is headed "Title".)
- Citation: 31 Hen. 8. c. 10
- Territorial extent: England and Wales

Dates
- Royal assent: 28 June 1539
- Commencement: 28 April 1539 (Note: Start of session.)
Other legislation
Amended by	Statute Law Revision Act 1888; Criminal Justice Act 1948; Statute Law Revision Act 1948

Status: Amended

Text of statute as originally enacted

Revised text of statute as amended

Text of the House of Lords Precedence Act 1539 as in force today (including any amendments) within the United Kingdom, from legislation.gov.uk.

The House of Lords Precedence Act 1539 (31 Hen. 8. c. 10) is an act of the Parliament of England. It prescribed the order of precedence of members of the House of Lords. However, some of it has since been superseded or repealed, and so for the full order of precedence today other sources should also be consulted.

As of 2025, the act is partly in force in Great Britain (as at at least end of 2010).

== Provisions ==
The act set the order of precedence as follows: the sovereign's children; the "Vicegerent" (Thomas Cromwell); the Archbishop of Canterbury; the Archbishop of York; the bishops; the Lord Chancellor; the Lord High Treasurer; the Lord President of the King's Council; the Lord Privy Seal; the Lord Great Chamberlain; the Lord Constable; the Earl Marshal; the Lord High Admiral; the Lord Steward; and the King's Chamberlain; followed by all other dukes, marquesses, earls, viscounts and barons.

== Preamble ==
The appointment of Thomas Cromwell to the new office of vicegerent, which had been made in the interval between the parliament of 1536, and that of 1539, the latter of these assemblies seized the earliest moment of confirming by their recognition; avoiding, however, the appearance of the necessity of their sanction, by introducing the fact of appointment and the description of the office into the preamble of this statute, where a matter so weighty otherwise appears to be exceedingly misplaced.

How the lords in parliament shall be placed.

Forasmuch as in all great councils and congregations of men, having sundry degrees and offices in the commonwealth, it is very requisite and convenient that an order should be had and taken for the How the placing and fitting of such persons as been bounden to resort to the same, to the intent that they, knowing their places, may use the same without displeasure or let of the council; therefore the King's most royal majesty, although it appertaineth unto his prerogative royal to give such honour, reputation and placing to his councellors, and other his subjects, as shall be seeming to his most excellent wisdom, is nevertheless pleased and contented, for an order to be had and taken in this his most high court of parliament, that it shall be enacted by authority of the same, in manner and form as hereafter followeth.

=== Section 1 ===
None but the King’s Children shall sit on either Side of the Cloth of Estate in Parliament.

Forasmouche as in all great Counsells and Congregacions of Men, havinge sundrie degrees and offices in the common wealth, yt is verie requisite and convenient that an order shulde be had and taken for the placinge and sittinge of suche persons as bene bounde to resorte to the same, to thentent that they knowinge their places maye use the same without displeasure or lett of the Counsell; Therfore the Kinges most royall Majestie, althought it apperteyneth unto his perogatyve royall to give suche honour reputation and placinge to his Counsellors and other his subjects as shalbe semynge to his most excellent Wisdome, ys nevertheles pleased and contented for an order to be had and taken in this his moste highe Courte of Parliament, that it shalbe enacted by authoritie of the same in manner and forme as hereafter followeth; First it is enacted by authoritie aforsaide that noe person or persons of what estate degree or condition soever he or they be of, Excepte onlie the Kings Children, shall at any tyme hereafter attempte or presume to sytt or have place at any side of the Clothe of estate in the parliament Chamber, nother of the one hand of the Kings Highnes nor of the other, whether the Kings Majestie be there personallie present or absent.

=== Section 2 ===
Section 2 of the act, except the words from "And foreasmuch" to "Churche of England", was repealed by schedule 1 to the Statute Law Revision Act 1948 (11 & 12 Geo. 6. c. 62). The unrepealed words are introductory words describing the Sovereign as Head of the Church.

Place of the King’s Ecclesiastical Vicegerent; above the Archbishop of Canterbury.

And forasmuche as the Kings Majestie is justly and laufullie supreme hed in Erthe, under God, of the Churche of Englande, [and for the good exercise of the said most royal dignity and office, hath made Thomas lord Crumwel and lord privy seal, his vicegerent, for good and due ministration of justice to be had in all causes and cases touching the ecclestastical jurisdiction, and for the godly reformation and redress of all errors, heresies and abuses in the said church.'m]

[The King's viceregent in ecclesiastical jurisdiction.]

[It is therefore also enacted by authority aforesaid, That the said lord Crumwel, having the said office of vicegerent, and all other persons which hereafter shall have the said office of the grant of the King's highnness, his heirs or successors, shall sit and be placed, as well in this present parliament, as in all parliaments to be holden hereafter, on the right side of the parliament chamber, and upon the same form that the archbishop of Canterbury sitteth on, and above the same archbishop and his successors, and shall have voice in every parliament to assent or dissent, as other the lords of the parliament.]

=== Section 3 ===
Places of the Archbishops and Bishops.

And that next to the saide Vicegerent, shall sitt the Archebisshopp of Canterburie, and then next him on the same fourme and syde shall sytt the Archebisshop of York, and next to him on the same fourme and syde the Bisshopp of London, and next to him on the same syde and fourme the Bisshop of Duresme, and next to him on the same syde and fourme the Bysshopp of Winchester; and then all the other Bisshoppes of both provinces of Canterburie and Yorke shall sytt and be placed on the same side after their auncyentes as it hath bene accustomed.

=== Section 4 ===
Places of the Lord Chancellor, Lord Treasurer, Lord President of the Council, Lord Privy Seal.

And forasmuche as suche other personages which nowe have and hereafter shall happen to have other great offices of the Realme, that is to saye, the offices of the Lorde Chauncellour, the Lorde Tresorer, the Lorde President of the Kings most honorable Counsell, the Lorde Privey Seale, the Great Chamberleyn of Englande, the Constable of Englande, the Marciall of Englande, the Lorde Admyrall, the Graunde Maister or Lorde Stewarde of the Kings most honorable housholde, the Kinges Chamberleyn, and the Kinges Secretarie, hathe not heretofore bene appointed and ordered for the placinge and sittinge in the Kings most highe Courte of Parliament by reason of their offices, It is therfore nowe ordeyned and enacted by thaucoritie aforesaide that the Lorde Chauncellour, the Lorde Treasourer, the Lorde President of the Kings Counsell and the Lorde Privey Seale beinge of the degre of Barons of the Parliament, or above, shall sytt and be placed, aswell in this present Parliament as in all other Parliaments hereafter to be holden, on the lyfte syde of the saide Parliament Chamber on the higher parte of the fourme of the same side, above all Dukes, Excepte onlie suche as shall happen to be the Kinges sonne, the Kinges brother, the Kinges Uncle, the Kinges Nephewe or the Kinges Brothers or Sisters Sonnes.

=== Section 5 ===
Places of Lords Great Chamberlain, Constable, Marshal, Admiral, Steward, King’s Chamberlain.

And, that the great Chamberleyn, the Constable, the Marciall, the Lorde Admyrall, the Great Maister or Lorde Stewarde and the Kinges Chamberleyn, shall sytt and be placed after the Lorde Privie Seale in manner and forme followinge that is to saye; everie of them shall sitt and be placed above all other personages beinge of the same estates and degrees that they shall happen to be; that is to say, the Great Chamberleyn first, the Constable next, the Marciall thirde, the Lorde Admyrall the fourth, the Graunde Maister or Lorde Stewarde the fiveth, and the Kings Chamberleyn the sixt.

=== Section 6 ===
Place of the King’s Chief Secretary.

And that the Kinges Chief Secretory beinge of the degre of a Baron of the Parliament shall sytt and be placed afore and above all Baronys, not havinge eny of the offices aforemencioned; And if he be a Bisshoppe, that then he shall sytt and be placed above all other Bisshopps, not havinge any of the offices above remembred.

=== Section 7 ===
All Nobility according to seniority.

And it is also ordeyned and enacted by authoritie aforesaide that all Dukes not afore mencioned, Marquesses Earles Vicounts and Barons, not havinge anye of the offices aforesaide, shall sytt and be placed after ther Auncients as it hathe been accustomed.

=== Section 8 ===
Places of the Chancellor, &c. if under the Degree of Barons.

And that if any person or persons which at any tyme hereafter shall happen to have anye of the saide offices of Lorde Chauncelor Lorde Treasorer, Lorde Precident of the Kings Counsell, Lorde Privey Seale or Chief Secretorie, shalbe under the degree of a Baron of the Parliament, by reason wherof they can have noe interest to give any assent or dissent in the saide House, that then in everie such case suche of them as shall happen to be under the saide degree of a Baron, shall sitt and be placed at the uppermost parte of the sakkes in the middes of the saide Parliament Chamber, eyther there to sytt uppon one fourme or uppon the uppermost sakk, the one of them above the other in order as is above rehersed.

=== Section 9 ===
Section 9 of the act was repealed by section 83(3) of, and part III of schedule 10 to, the Criminal Justice Act 1948 (11 & 12 Geo. 6. c. 58), which abolished the jurisdiction of the House of Lords as a criminal court and provided that peers would be tried by the ordinary courts instead.

[Places in trials by peers.]

[Be it also enacted by authority aforesaid, That in all trials of treasons by peers of this realm, if any of the peers that shall be called hereafter to be triours of such treasons, shall happen to have any of the offices aforesaid, that then they, having such offices, shall sit and be placed according to their offices, above all the other peers that shall be called to such trials, in manner and form as is above mentioned and rehearsed.]

=== Section 10 ===
In this section, the words "in the Sterr Chamber and" were repealed by schedule 1 to the Statute Law Revision Act 1948 (11 & 12 Geo. 6. c. 62). The Star Chamber to which it referred had been abolished over 300 years previously by the Habeas Corpus Act 1640 (16 Cha. 1. c. 10).

Places of Great Officers in the Star Chamber, or in other Councils.

And that aswell in all Parliaments as [in the Sterr Chamber and] in all other assemblies and conferences of Counsell, the Lorde Chauncelor, the Lorde Tresorer, the Lorde Precident, the Lorde Privey Seale, the Great Chamberleyn, the Constable, the Marciall, the Lorde Admyrall, the Graunde Maister or Lorde Stewarde, the Kinges Chamberleyn, and the Kingse Chief Secretorie, shall sytt and be placed in suche order and fashion as is above rehersed, & not in any other place by authoritie of this present acte.

== See also ==
- Orders of precedence in the United Kingdom

== Bibliography ==
- Halsbury's Statutes of England and Wales. Fourth Edition. 2010 Reissue. Volume 10(1). Page 101.
