= Orders of precedence in the United Kingdom =

Relative preeminence of officials for ceremonial purposes

The order of precedence in the United Kingdom is the sequential hierarchy for Peers of the Realm, officers of state, senior members of the clergy, holders of the various Orders of Chivalry, and is mostly determined by, but not limited to, birth order, place in the line of succession, or distance from the reigning monarch. The order of precedence can also be applied to other persons in the three legal jurisdictions within the United Kingdom:

- England and Wales
- Scotland

Separate orders exist for men and women.

== Determination of precedence ==
The order of precedence is determined by various methods. The House of Lords Precedence Act 1539 (which technically applies only to determine seating in the House of Lords Chamber) and the Acts of Union with Scotland and Ireland generally set precedence for members of the nobility. The statutes of the various Orders of Chivalry set precedence for their members. In other cases, precedence may be decided by the sovereign's order, by a Royal Warrant of Precedence, by letters patent, by Acts of Parliament, or by custom.

== Source of precedence ==
One may acquire precedence for various reasons. Firstly, one may be an office-holder. Secondly, one may be of a particular degree such as duke. Thirdly, in the case of women, one may be the wife of a title-holder (note that wives acquire precedence due to their husbands, but husbands do not gain any special precedence due to their wives). Finally, one may be the son or daughter of a title-holder.

One does not gain precedence as a child of a lady, unless that lady is a peeress in her own right. Furthermore, if a daughter of a peer marries a commoner, then she retains her precedence as a daughter of a peer. However, if she marries a peer, then her precedence is based on her husband's status, and not on her father's.

== Royal family ==
The King or Queen of the United Kingdom, as the sovereign, is always first in the order of precedence. A king is followed by his queen consort, the first in the order of precedence for women. The reverse, however, is not always true for queens regnant. There is no established law of precedence for a prince consort, so he is usually specially granted precedence above all other men by letters patent; if he is not specially provided for, he may rank lower than the heir apparent or the heir presumptive, even if the heir is his own son (eg Edward VII—as Prince of Wales—outranked his father, Prince Albert).

Order of precedence for male members of the royal family
The sovereign: 1. King Charles III	Whether male or female.
The Prince of Wales and Duke of Cornwall: 1. William, Prince of Wales	i.e., the sovereign's eldest son.
The sovereign's younger sons: 1. Prince Harry, Duke of Sussex	Ordered according to their births.
The sovereign's grandsons: 1. Prince George of Wales; 2. Prince Louis of Wales; 3. Prince Archie of Sussex	Ordered according to the rules of primogeniture.
The sovereign's brothers: 1. Andrew Mountbatten-Windsor; 2. Prince Edward, Duke of Edinburgh	Ordered according to their births.
The sovereign's uncles: 1. N/A	i.e., the brothers of the sovereign's royal parent (through whom he inherited the throne); ordered according to their births.
The sovereign's nephews: 1. James, Earl of Wessex; 2. Peter Phillips	i.e., the sons of the sovereign's siblings; ordered according to the rules of primogeniture.
The sovereign’s cousins: 1. David Armstrong-Jones, 2nd Earl of Snowdon	i.e., the sons of the siblings of the sovereign's royal parent (through whom he inherited the throne); ordered according to the rules of primogeniture.
Order of precedence for female members of the royal family
The sovereign: 1. King Charles III	Whether male or female.
Queen consort: 1. Queen Camilla	Current consort.
Queen(s) dowager: 1. N/A	Ordered most recent consort first.
The Princess of Wales and Duchess of Cornwall: 1. Catherine, Princess of Wales	i.e., the wife of the sovereign's eldest son.
Wives of the sovereign's younger sons: 1. Meghan, Duchess of Sussex	Ordered according to their husbands' precedence.
The sovereign's daughters: 1. N/A	Ordered according to their births
Wives of the sovereign's grandsons: 1. N/A	Ordered according to their husbands' precedence.
The sovereign's granddaughters: 1. Princess Charlotte of Wales; 2. Princess Lilibet of Sussex	Ordered according to the rules of primogeniture.
Wives of the sovereign's brothers: 1. Sophie, Duchess of Edinburgh	Ordered according to their husbands' precedence.
The sovereign's sisters: 1. Anne, Princess Royal	Ordered according to their births.
Wives of the sovereign's uncles: 1. N/A	Ordered according to their husbands' precedence.
The sovereign's aunts: 1. N/A	i.e., the sisters of the sovereign's royal parent (through whom she inherited the throne); ordered according to their births
Wives of the sovereign's nephews: 1. Harriet Phillips	Ordered according to their husbands' precedence.
The sovereign's nieces: 1. Princess Beatrice, Mrs Edoardo Mapelli Mozzi; 2. Princess Eugenie, Mrs Jack Brooksbank; 3. Lady Louise Mountbatten-Windsor; 4. Zara Tindall	i.e., the daughters of the sovereign's siblings; ordered according to the rules of primogeniture.
Wives of the sovereign's cousins: 1. Serena Armstrong-Jones, Countess of Snowdon	Ordered according to their husbands' precedence.
The sovereign's cousins: 1. Lady Sarah Chatto	i.e., the daughters of the siblings of the sovereign's royal parent (through whom he inherited the throne); ordered according to the rules of primogeniture.

=== Current practice ===
- Letters patent dated 31 December 2012 declared all the children of the eldest son of the Prince of Wales should have and enjoy the style, title, and attribute of Royal Highness with the titular dignity of Prince or Princess prefixed to their Christian names or with such other titles of honour. Before Charles III's accession to the throne, all of Prince William's, then Duke of Cambridge, children were known as prince or princess. However, as Prince George, the eldest son of the Prince of Wales, has no children, no person presently qualifies for HRH status under these letters patent.
- There is no specific place in the order for a great-grandchild of the sovereign (no matter how senior in the order of succession). The sons of a duke of the blood royal are entitled to precedence after all non-royal dukes, pursuant to the unrevoked Lord Chamberlain's Order of 1520 as amended in 1595. The daughters have the equivalent position in the women's order.

== Officers of state ==
In England and Wales, the Archbishop of Canterbury is the highest in precedence following the royal family. Then come, assuming the post of Lord High Steward is vacant (as it usually has been since 1421), the Lord Chancellor, and the Archbishop of York. Next come the Prime Minister (since 1905), the Lord President of the Privy Council, the Speaker of the House of Commons, the Lord Speaker of the House of Lords (since July 2006), the President of the Supreme Court of the United Kingdom (since October 2009), the Lord Chief Justice of England and Wales (since November 2007) and the Lord Privy Seal.

The precedence of the Lord Great Chamberlain, the Earl Marshal, the Lord Steward and the Lord Chamberlain are determined by the rank and class of the peerage of the holders of such offices.

In Scotland, the Keeper of the Great Seal of Scotland and the Keeper of the Privy Seal of Scotland, if peers, rank after the Lord Speaker of the House of Lords. If not so, then they rank after the younger sons of dukes. The hereditary High Constable of Scotland and the Master of the Household of Scotland rank above dukes. If the Keepers of the Seals are peers, then the Keepers precede the High Constable and Master.

== Peers of the Realm ==
The ranks of Peers are as follows: Duke (and Duchess), Marquess (or Marquis; and Marchioness), Earl (and Countess), Viscount (and Viscountess), and Baron (and Baroness) together with Scottish Lord (and Lady) of Parliament.

Within their own respective ranks, the ranks of Peers correspond to the age (venerability) of the creation of their peerages; that is, the older the title, the more senior the title's holder is. However, seniority rules also depend on the country within the current UK where the title originated, so that English peers hold the highest ranks, followed by Scottish peers. After English and Scottish peers, peers created in Great Britain as whole in (1707–1801) follow. Together over the Pre-Union Peerage of Ireland (pre-1801), and together they all take precedence over either the senior Peerage of the United Kingdom (post-1801), or the junior Post-Union Peerage of Ireland (1801–1922).

Subject to the same governing rules as detailed in the paragraphs above, the rank of the wives of Peers is also governed by the venerability (age) of the peerage. A dowager Peeress (widow of a deceased Peer) would however precede the wife of the present Peer, as precedence is determined by the seniority of the title, in contradistinction to the rule that pertains to dowager queens, for example, who rank below queens consort.

Barons and Baronesses of the life peerage rank immediately below Barons and Baronesses of the hereditary peerage and Scottish Lords and Ladies in Parliament.

== Primates, archbishops, bishops, Scottish Lord High Commissioners and moderators ==
In England and Wales, the Archbishop of Canterbury, Primate of All England, is the most senior person outside of royalty, and after the Lord Chancellor, immediately followed by the Archbishop of York, Primate of England. Primates (i.e. archbishops) and bishops of the Church of England rank immediately above peers. First come the Bishops of London and Durham, followed by the Bishop of Winchester, followed by the other diocesan bishops in order of seniority, and then the suffragan bishops in order of seniority.

The Bishop of Sodor and Man and the Anglican Bishop of Gibraltar in Europe, whose Sees are full and integral parts of the Ecclesiastical Provinces of York and Canterbury, respectively, are also usually included as suffragan bishops of the Church of England for the purpose of precedence.

See the list of Lords Spiritual for the most senior 21 diocesan bishops ordered by seniority.

In Scotland, the Lord High Commissioner to the General Assembly of the Church of Scotland ranks immediately below the sovereign or consort (depending on their respective sex), but only when the General Assembly is in session, and immediately followed by the Moderator of the General Assembly of the Church of Scotland.

According to the unofficial order of precedence for Northern Ireland published by the publishers of Burke's Peerage, 106th Edition, , the precedence of all of the primates and archbishops of the Catholic Church in Ireland and the Church of Ireland, together with the Moderator of the Presbyterian Church in Ireland, are to be determined solely by seniority, according to the dates of consecration or translation, or the date of election, in the case of the Presbyterian Moderator, without any presumption of automatic Roman Catholic or Protestant seniority, Anglican or Presbyterian.

== Baronets, knights and holders of state honours ==
The two highest orders of chivalry in England and Wales, and in Scotland, are the Order of the Garter, and the Order of the Thistle, respectively. Knights/Ladies Companion of the Order of the Garter (KG/LG) and Knights/Ladies of the Order of the Thistle (KT/LT) precede baronets (Bt./Btss.). After the baronets then come the remaining members of all the other British orders of chivalry, starting with Knights/Dames Grand Cross of the Order of the Bath (GCB), in the following order of their ranks: Knight or Dame Grand Cross, Knight or Dame Commander, Commander or Companion, Lieutenant or Officer, and Member.

For individual members with equivalent ranks but of different orders, precedence is accorded based on the seniority of the British orders of chivalry: the Order of the Bath, the Order of St Michael and St George, the Royal Victorian Order, and the Order of the British Empire. For equivalent ranks and orders, those appointed earlier precede those appointed later. Knights Bachelor come after Knights Commander of the Order of the British Empire.

Wives of Knights Companion of the Order of the Garter, Knights of the Order of the Thistle, and Knights Grand Cross, Knights Commanders, and Commanders or Companions of the other orders of chivalry, all receive precedence based on their husbands' positions. Wives of individuals of a certain rank follow in precedence after female holders of the same rank. Thus, for example, wives of Knights Grand Cross follow Dames Grand Cross.

Wives of baronets go immediately above all Dames Grand Cross of the British chivalric orders, and therefore are below Ladies Companion and wives of Knights Companion of the Order of the Garter, Ladies and wives of Knights of the Order of the Thistle, and wives of Knights of the Order of St Patrick. Baronets' widows follow rules similar to dowager peeresses: a widow of a previous baronet comes immediately before the wife of the present baronet.

== See also ==
- British Army order of precedence
- Line of succession to the British throne
- Forms of address in the United Kingdom
- The House of Lords Precedence Act 1539
- The Union with Scotland Act 1706, article XXIII
- The Union with Ireland Act 1800
- Ministerial ranking
