= Viscount Severn =

Title in the Peerage of England

- Arms of Prince Edward, Duke of Edinburgh
- Creation date: 19 June 1999
- Creation: First
- Created by: Elizabeth II
- Peerage: Peerage of the United Kingdom
- Present holder: Prince Edward, Duke of Edinburgh
- Heir apparent: James, Earl of Wessex
- Remainder to: the 1st Viscount's heirs male of the body lawfully begotten.
- Status: Extant
- Seat: Bagshot Park

Viscount Severn is a title in the Peerage of the United Kingdom. The name of the viscountcy is derived from the River Severn that runs through England and Wales. The title, along with the Earldom of Wessex, was bestowed on Prince Edward by his mother, Queen Elizabeth II, upon his marriage to Sophie Rhys-Jones. Between 1999 and 2023, the title was a subsidiary title of the Earldom of Wessex and Earldom of Forfar. Since 2023, the title is a subsidiary title of the Dukedom of Edinburgh upon the granting of the dukedom to Prince Edward.

== History ==
Viscount Severn was used by minor members of the royal family in the 18th century. There is a history of being given a secondary title so the eldest son can have it as a courtesy title.

The title Viscount Severn was given in allusion to the Welsh roots of Sophie Rhys-Jones's family. The significance of this title is that it alludes to her ancestors having ruled the land Between Wye and Severn. This was the first time a royal prince was granted a viscountcy since 1726 when the title was given to two of George II's sons.

=== First creation, 1999 ===
Between 17 December 2007 and 10 March 2023, Viscount Severn was used as a courtesy title by Prince Edward's son, James, Earl of Wessex. When his father was conferred the Dukedom of Edinburgh, James instead became styled Earl of Wessex. The title will once again be used as a courtesy title should James have a son.

Viscount	Portrait	Birth	Marriage(s)	Death
Prince Edward; House of Windsor; 1999–present also: Duke of Edinburgh (2023), Earl of Wessex (1999), Earl of Forfar (2019)	Prince Edward	10 March 1964; Buckingham Palace, London son of Queen Elizabeth II and Prince Philip	19 June 1999; Sophie Rhys-Jones; 2 children	– now 62 years, 256 days old

== Line of succession ==
- Prince Edward, Duke of Edinburgh (b. 1964)
  - (1) James, Earl of Wessex (b. 2007)
