= Earl of Wessex =

British noble title

Earldom of Wessex held with Earldom of Forfar
- Arms of Prince Edward, Earl of Wessex
- Creation date: 19 June 1999
- Creation: Second
- Created by: Elizabeth II
- Peerage: Peerage of the United Kingdom
- First holder: Godwin of Wessex
- Present holder: Prince Edward, Duke of Edinburgh
- Heir apparent: James, Earl of Wessex (Note: James is styled with the courtesy title Earl of Wessex due to it being his father's most senior subsidiary title.)
- Remainder to: the 1st Earl's heirs male of the body lawfully begotten.
- Subsidiary titles: Viscount Severn
- Status: Extant
- Seat: Bagshot Park

Earl of Wessex is a title that has been created twice in the History of the British Isles – once in the pre-Norman Conquest Anglo-Saxon nobility of England, and once in the Peerage of the United Kingdom. In the 6th century AD the region of Wessex (the lands of the West Saxons), in the south and southwest of present-day England, became one of the Anglo-Saxon kingdoms (one of the components of the so-called Heptarchy); in the tenth century the increasing power of the Kingdom of the West Saxons led to a united Kingdom of England.

== First creation (c. 1019) ==
Wessex was one of the four earldoms of Anglo-Danish England. In this period, the earldom of Wessex covered the lands of the old kingdom of Wessex, covering the counties of the south of England, and extending west to the Welsh border.

During the reign of King Cnut, he conferred the earldom on Godwin at some time after 1020. Thereafter, Godwin rose to become, in the time of Edward the Confessor, the most powerful man in the kingdom. Upon Godwin's death in 1053, the earldom passed to his son, who later became King Harold II and died at the Battle of Hastings in 1066; the earldom became extinct on his death.

Earl	Portrait	Birth	Marriage(s)	Death
Godwin, Earl of Wessex; House of Godwin also: Earl of Kent (1020)		Born probably in Sussex, Godwin's father was probably Wulfnoth Cild, who was a thegn of Sussex	Gytha Thorkelsdóttir c. 997; 11 children	15 April 1053; Winchester, Hampshire, England; Age unknown
Harold Godwinson; House of Godwin also: Earl of East Anglia (1052); King of England (1066)		c. 1022 Son of Godwin of Wessex and Gytha Thorkelsdóttir	(1) Edith Swannesha; 5 children (2) Ealdgyth c. 1064; 2 sons	14 October 1066; Hastings; Died in the Battle of Hastings aged about 44

== Second creation (1999) ==
The current Earl of Wessex is also Duke of Edinburgh, Earl of Forfar, and Viscount Severn. The title of Earl of Wessex is currently used as a courtesy title by the Duke's son and heir apparent to the earldoms of Wessex and Forfar, James Mountbatten-Windsor.

In 1999, Queen Elizabeth II's youngest son, Prince Edward, married Sophie Rhys-Jones. Younger sons of the monarch have customarily been given dukedoms at the time of their marriage, and experts had suggested the former royal dukedoms of Cambridge and Sussex as the most likely to be granted to Prince Edward. Instead, the Palace announced that Prince Edward would eventually be given the title Duke of Edinburgh, which was at the time held by his father.

As such, preserving the rank of duke for the future, Prince Edward became the first British prince in centuries to be specifically created an earl, rather than a duke. His wife Sophie became the Countess of Wessex. The Sunday Telegraph newspaper reported that Edward was drawn to the historic title of Earl of Wessex after watching the 1998 film Shakespeare in Love, in which a character with the title “Lord Wessex” is played by Colin Firth.

As a younger son, Edward could not inherit the title Duke of Edinburgh directly on the death of his father, Prince Philip. Instead, the dukedom was newly created for Edward on 10 March 2023, after it had reverted to the Crown following "both the death of the first Duke of Edinburgh, (Note: This took place in 2021) and the second Duke Charles III's succession as King."

On Edward's creation as Duke of Edinburgh in 2023, Edward's son James became styled with the courtesy title of Earl of Wessex, now his father's most senior subsidiary title. Earl of Wessex is the most senior title James is expected to hold, as he will not inherit the title of Duke of Edinburgh which was awarded to his father as a life peerage.

Earl	Portrait	Birth	Marriage(s)	Death
Prince Edward; House of Windsor; 1999–present also: Duke of Edinburgh (2023), Earl of Forfar (2019), Viscount Severn (1999)	Prince Edward	10 March 1964; Buckingham Palace, London Son of Queen Elizabeth II and Prince Philip	19 June 1999; Sophie Rhys-Jones; 2 children	Alive (now 62 years, 256 days old)

== Line of succession ==
- Prince Edward, Duke of Edinburgh (b. 1964)
  - (1) James, Earl of Wessex (b. 2007)

== Fictional characters ==
1971 film Rum Runners includes a character named Lord William Percival Hammond, Marquess of Wessex, played by Clive Revill, a love interest of actress Linda Larue (Brigitte Bardot). During the film, the character introduces himself as “William Percival Rupert Plantagenet Hammond, 14th Marquess of Wessex, 11th Earl of Shetland, 17th Viscount of Fair Isle”.

A character in the 1998 film Shakespeare in Love, called “Lord Wessex”, was played by Colin Firth. The Sunday Telegraph newspaper reported that Prince Edward was drawn to the title after watching the film.
