= Royal Windsor Horse Show =

United Kingdom Horse Show

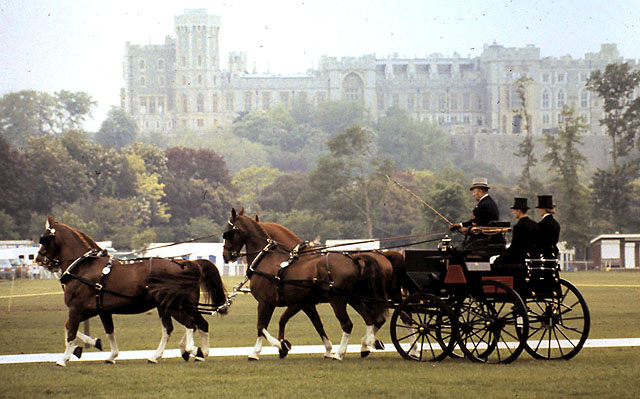
Royal Windsor Horse Show, May 1990

The Royal Windsor Horse Show is a horse show held annually since 1943 for five days in May or June in Windsor Home Park.

The show is the only one in the United Kingdom to host international competition for dressage, show jumping, carriage driving and endurance riding. In addition, there are more than 130 showing classes. It annually attracts more than 50,000 visitors and has key sponsors, including Jaguar Land Rover through their Defender brand, Hermès, Rolex, Pol Roger and many more.

The show has always had the honour being attended by royalty and Queen Elizabeth II was patron to the show until her death in 2022. She was succeeded in her role as patron by King Charles III. The current president of the show is Prince Edward, Duke of Edinburgh, whilst the vice president is Sophie, Duchess of Edinburgh.
