= Prince Edward, Duke of Edinburgh =

British prince (born 1964)

Prince Edward
- Duke of Edinburgh (more)
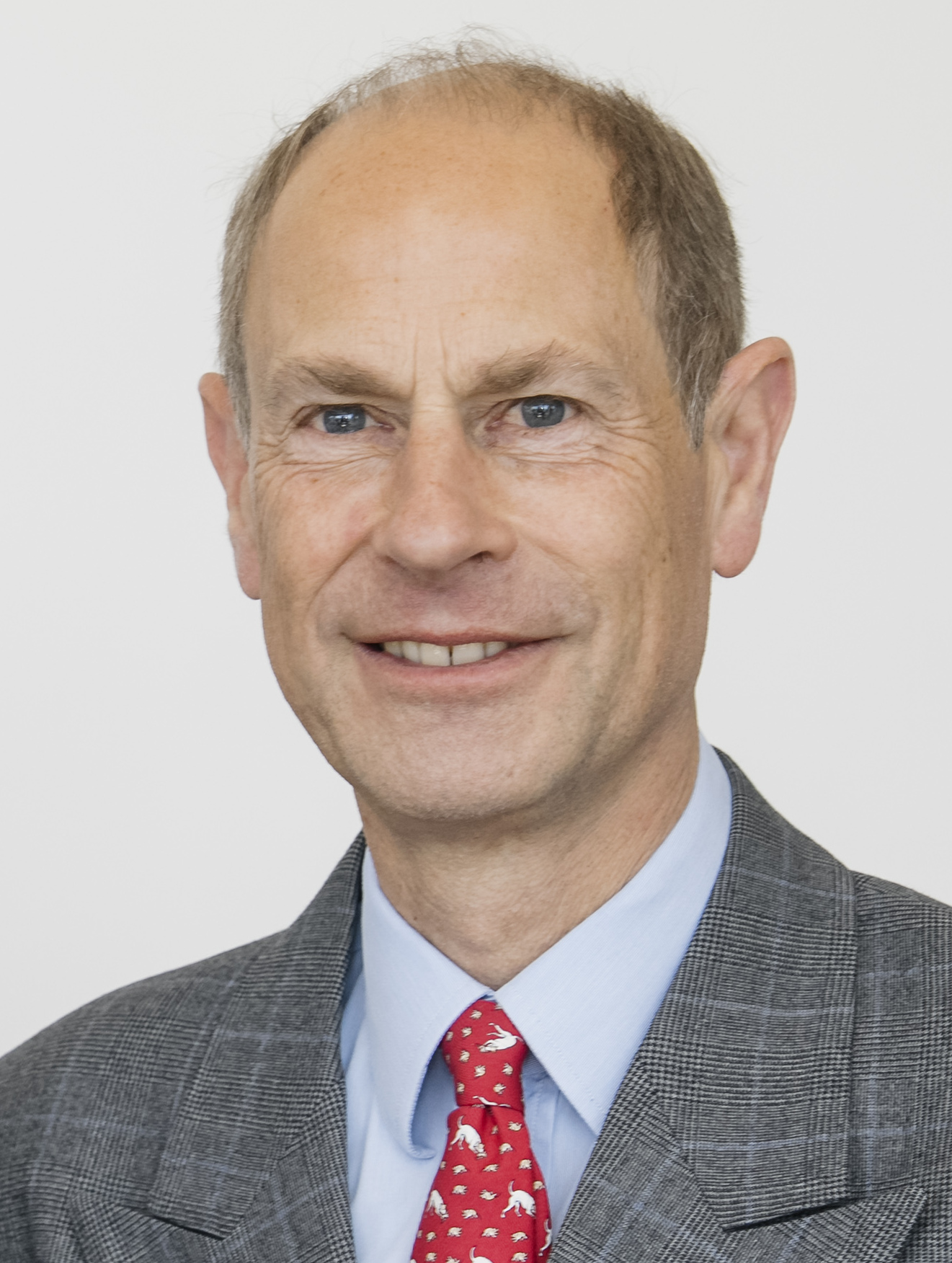
- Edward in 2025
- Born: 10 March 1964 (age 62); Buckingham Palace, London, England
- Spouse: Sophie Rhys-Jones (m. 1999)
- Issue: Lady Louise Mountbatten-Windsor; James Mountbatten-Windsor, Earl of Wessex
Names
- Edward Antony Richard Louis (Note: As a member of the royal family, Edward does not usually use a family name but when one is needed, it is Mountbatten-Windsor. The middle name Louis is pronounced /ˈluːi/.)
- House: Windsor
- Father: Prince Philip, Duke of Edinburgh
- Mother: Elizabeth II
- Education: Jesus College, Cambridge (BA)

Member of the House of Lords
- Lord Temporal
- Hereditary peerage 19 June 1999 – 11 November 1999

Prince Edward, Duke of Edinburgh (Edward Antony Richard Louis; born 10 March 1964), is a member of the British royal family. He is the youngest child of Queen Elizabeth II and Prince Philip, Duke of Edinburgh, and the youngest sibling of King Charles III. Edward was born third in the line of succession to the British throne and is 16th as of 2026.

Born at Buckingham Palace during the reign of his mother, Edward studied at Heatherdown School and completed his A-Levels at Gordonstoun before spending part of his gap year teaching at Whanganui Collegiate School in New Zealand. He then went on to read history at Jesus College, Cambridge, graduating in 1986 with a Bachelor of Arts degree. After a brief stint in the Royal Marines, he worked as a theatre production assistant at the Really Useful Theatre Company before assisting in television production. He later formed his own company, Ardent Productions.

Edward stepped down from the company in 2002 to begin full-time duties as a working member of the royal family and undertook engagements on behalf of his mother. He holds patronage with over 70 charities and organisations, including the National Youth Theatre, the Sport and Recreation Alliance, and the British Paralympic Association. His charity work focuses on the arts, athletics, and the development of the Duke of Edinburgh's Award, which centres on fitness, wellbeing and community service.

Edward was given the title of Earl of Wessex prior to marrying Sophie Rhys-Jones in 1999. They have two children: Louise and James. Edward's mother conferred on him the additional title of Earl of Forfar in 2019. On Edward's 59th birthday in 2023, his brother Charles III granted him the title Duke of Edinburgh as a life peerage, a dukedom previously held by their father, who died in 2021, then briefly by Charles.

== Early life and education ==
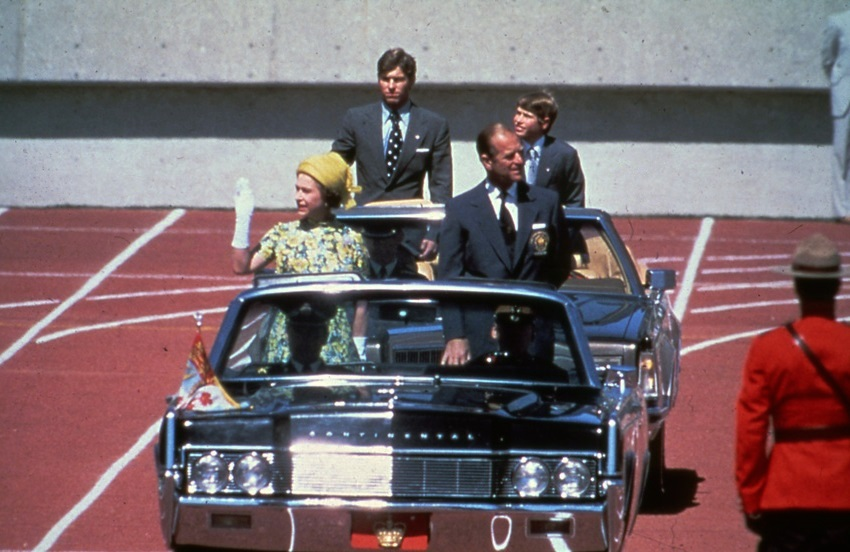
Edward and Andrew with their parents, Queen Elizabeth II and Prince Philip, Duke of Edinburgh, at the opening of the 1978 Commonwealth Games in Edmonton, Canada

Edward was born at 8:20 pm on 10 March 1964 at Buckingham Palace, London, the third son and the fourth and youngest child of Queen Elizabeth II and Prince Philip, Duke of Edinburgh. He was the most recent child born to a reigning British monarch, and his was the only one of their children whose birth was witnessed by his father. Edward was baptised on 2 May in the private chapel at Windsor Castle.

As with his three elder siblings, Charles, Anne, and Andrew, a governess oversaw his early education at Buckingham Palace before he attended Collingham College in Kensington, then known as Gibbs School. In September 1972, Edward entered Heatherdown School, near Ascot in Berkshire. Following family tradition, he later moved to Gordonstoun in northern Scotland, where he was appointed head boy in his final term. At A-level, Edward obtained a C in English and two Ds in history and politics, and subsequently spent a gap year abroad, working for two terms as a house tutor and junior master at Wanganui Collegiate School in New Zealand.

On returning to the United Kingdom, Edward read history at Jesus College, Cambridge. His admission, despite modest A-Level results, attracted some comment at the time. He graduated in 1986 with a Bachelor of Arts degree (Lower Second Hons).

== Post-university ==
=== Royal Marines ===
After graduating in 1986, Edward joined the Royal Marines, who had reportedly sponsored his tuition at Cambridge on the understanding that he would undertake future service. He had originally signed up in 1983. In January 1987, he withdrew from the commando course after completing one-third of the 12‑month training. Media reports suggested that Prince Philip, then Captain General Royal Marines, was displeased, but Edward later stated that his father had not put undue pressure on him to reconsider and had supported his decision. Others noted that Philip was, in fact, the most sympathetic family member toward his son's decision. Buckingham Palace said that Edward's choice followed "much consideration" and that he was leaving with great regret, "but has concluded that he does not wish to make the service his long‑term career".

=== Theatre and television ===
After leaving military service, Edward opted to pursue a career in entertainment. He commissioned the 1986 musical Cricket from Andrew Lloyd Webber and Tim Rice for his mother's 60th birthday celebration, which led to a job offer at Lloyd Webber's Really Useful Theatre Company. There, he worked as a production assistant on musicals including The Phantom of the Opera, Starlight Express, and Cats. During this period, he met actress Ruthie Henshall, whom he dated for five years.

Edward's first foray into television production was The Grand Knockout Tournament, informally known as It's a Royal Knockout, broadcast on 15 June 1987. Four teams sponsored by Edward, his siblings Anne and Andrew, and Andrew's then wife, Sarah, competed for charity. The programme attracted criticism from the media and the public, and it was later reported that the Queen had not been in favour of the event, with her courtiers having advised against it. The broadcast nonetheless raised over £1,500,000 for its selected charities.

=== Ardent Productions ===
In 1993, Edward founded the television production company Ardent Productions. Ardent produced a number of documentaries and dramas, but Edward was accused in the media of using his royal connections for financial gain. Industry insiders described the company as "a sad joke" citing a perceived lack of professionalism in its operations. Andy Beckett, writing in The Guardian, remarked that "to watch Ardent's few dozen hours of broadcast output is to enter a strange kingdom where every man in Britain still wears a tie, where pieces to camera are done in cricket jumpers, where people clasp their hands behind their backs like guardsmen. Commercial breaks are filled with army recruiting advertisements".

Ardent's productions were better received in the United States, and a documentary Edward made in 1996 about his great-uncle Edward VIII (the Duke of Windsor) sold well internationally. Nonetheless, the company reported losses every year it operated, except for one year in which Edward did not draw a salary. In September 2001, an Ardent two‑man film crew allegedly invaded the privacy of Edward's nephew, Prince William, while he was studying at the University of St Andrews, in breach of industry guidelines concerning the privacy of members of the royal family. William’s father, Edward's elder brother Charles, was reportedly angered by the incident.

In March 2002, Edward announced that he would step down as production director and joint managing director of Ardent to focus on his public duties and support the Queen during her Golden Jubilee year. Ardent Productions was voluntarily dissolved in June 2009, with assets reduced to just £40.

== Marriage and children ==
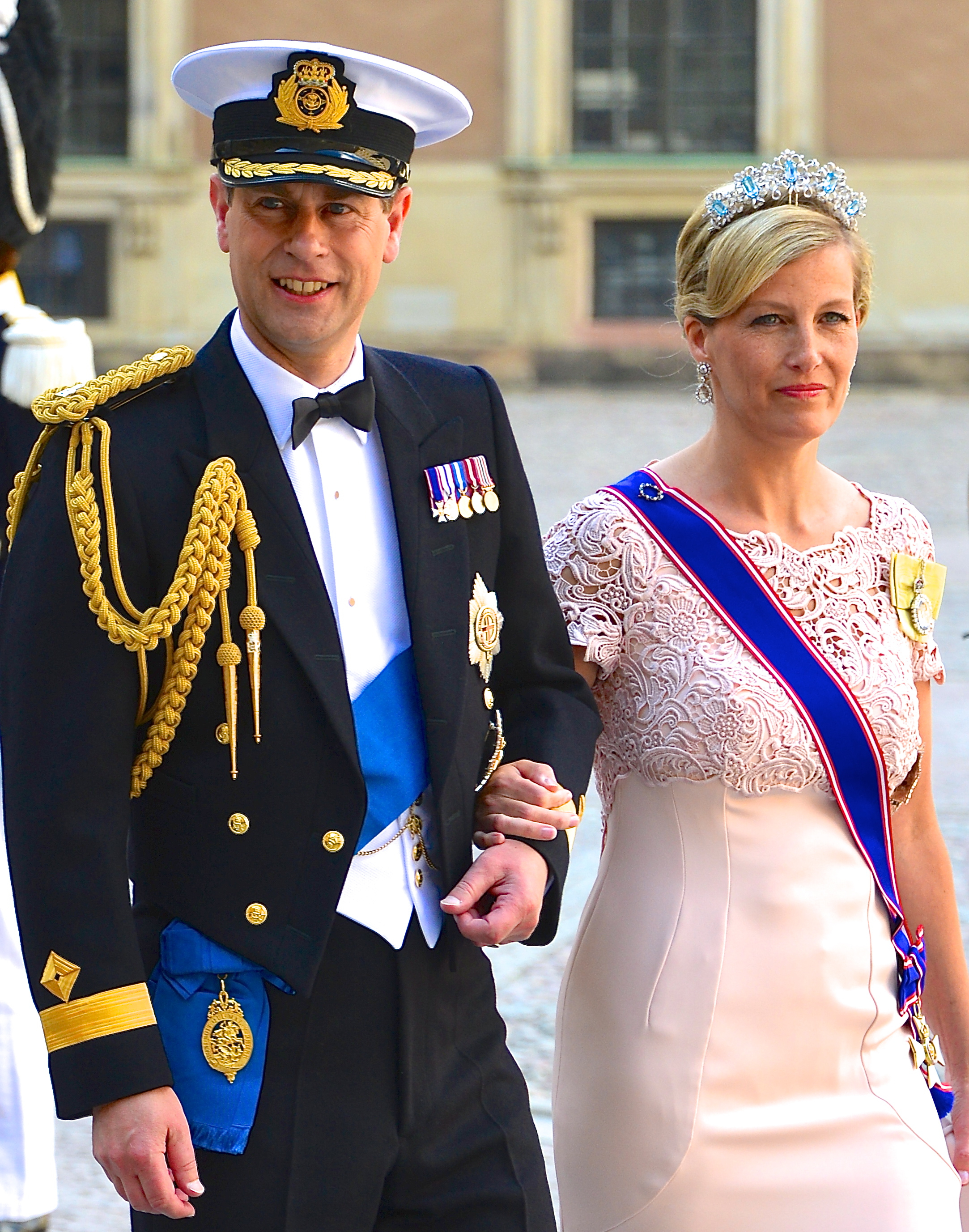
Edward and Sophie in Stockholm for the wedding of Princess Madeleine and Christopher O'Neill, 2013

Edward met Sophie Rhys-Jones in 1987 when he was dating one of her friends. They met again in 1993 at a promotional shoot for the Prince Edward Summer Challenge, a charity event, and began their relationship soon afterwards. In December 1993, amid growing speculation that they were planning to marry, Edward wrote to newspaper editors denying any wedding plans and asking the media to respect their privacy. He proposed to Sophie while on holiday in the Bahamas in December 1998, and their engagement was announced on 6 January 1999. He presented her with an Asprey and Garrard engagement ring worth an estimated £105,000, featuring a two-carat oval diamond flanked by two heart-shaped gemstones set in 18-carat white gold.

Their wedding took place on 19 June 1999 in St George's Chapel at Windsor Castle. The ceremony was a departure from the large, formal weddings of Edward's elder brothers at Westminster Abbey and St Paul's Cathedral, both of which had ended in divorce. On his wedding day, Edward was created Earl of Wessex, with the subsidiary title of Viscount Severn (alluding to the Welsh roots of the Countess's family), breaking with the tradition that sons of the sovereign were created royal dukes.

Sophie experienced an ectopic pregnancy in 2001. The couple have two children: Lady Louise Mountbatten-Windsor, born prematurely on 8 November 2003 following a sudden placental abruption; and James Mountbatten-Windsor (then Viscount Severn, now Earl of Wessex), born on 17 December 2007. Since 2023, Edward's children have been styled as the children of a duke rather than as Prince or Princess and do not use the style of Royal Highness.

The family's country residence is Bagshot Park, while their office and official London home is at Buckingham Palace. Edward's initial lease of Bagshot Park in 1998 was for 50 years at £5,000 a year, with the Crown Estate as landlord. Approximately £3 million was spent on refurbishment, of which Edward paid £1.36 million, after which the rent rose to £90,000 a year. In 2007, he extended the lease to 150 years; it was reported that he subsequently paid a peppercorn rent in return for an upfront payment of £5 million. In June 2026, it was revealed in a National Audit Office report that Edward had received private income from renting out the stable complex on the Bagshot Park estate to a third party until 2020.

== Activities ==
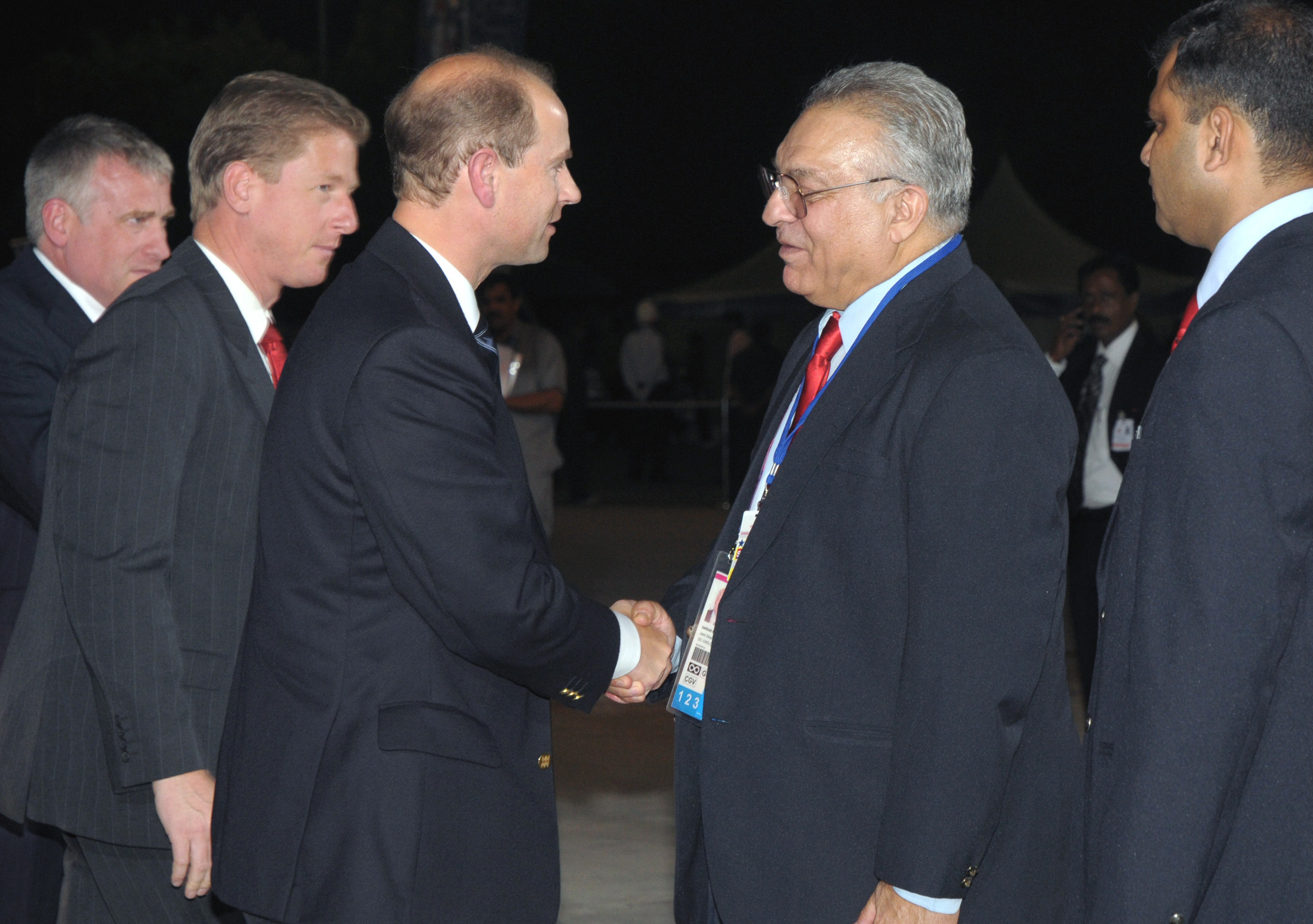
Edward visiting New Delhi as vice-patron of the Commonwealth Games Federation in 2010.

The Earl and Countess of Wessex established their foundation, the Bagshot Park Charity, later renamed the Wessex Youth Trust, in 1999, with a focus on helping, supporting, and advancing registered charities that provide opportunities specifically for children and young people. Twenty years after its inception, the Wessex Youth Trust changed its name to the Earl and Countess of Wessex Charitable Trust, managed by the private office of the Earl and Countess of Wessex and Forfar. It was announced that the trust's broad charitable objectives would not change; however, its future efforts would be directed towards supporting a different range of charities. In July 2023, the trust's remaining funds were transferred to the Edinburgh Trust No. 2, which had originally been set up in 1964.

Edward's patronages include the British Paralympic Association, the International Real Tennis Professionals Association, the Commonwealth Games Federation, BadmintonScotland, the Tennis and Rackets Association, the City of Birmingham Symphony Orchestra and Chorus, the London Mozart Players, Haddo House Choral and Operatic Society, Northern Ballet, the Edinburgh International Festival, the Royal Birmingham Conservatoire, the Production Guild, and National Youth Theatre.

The Earl of Wessex assumed many duties from his father, Prince Philip, as Philip reduced his commitments before retiring from royal duties. Edward opened the 1990 Commonwealth Games in New Zealand and the 1998 Commonwealth Games in Malaysia, and in 2006 became vice-patron of Commonwealth Games Federation, taking on his father's ceremonial responsibilities; Philip had served as president. He has also taken over his father's role in the Duke of Edinburgh's Award (DofE) scheme, attending Gold Award ceremonies around the world.

In September 2007, the Earl visited Israel in his capacity as Chairman of the International Council of the Duke of Edinburgh's Award to attend a number of events organised by the Israel Youth Award program, an affiliate of the Duke of Edinburgh's Award. Edward had himself received the Award's gold medal in 1986 for "a 60-mile, four-day trek from Blair Atholl to Tomintoul" that he had planned. He has been a trustee of the DofE since 1988 and of the International Award since 2006. Edward later became chair of trustees of the Duke of Edinburgh's International Award in 2015, and was named patron of the Duke of Edinburgh's Award in 2023. He has promoted the charity's work on different occasions.

Edward is also a trustee of the International Award Association, which "encompasses the DofE UK and all its other 61 National Award Authorities across the globe". He served as Chairman of the DofE's international council and, in 1999, founded the International Special Projects Group "to provide a capital fund to broaden the reach of the Award". In 2018, Edward, as patron of the Tennis and Rackets Association, played on all 50 real tennis courts around the world and raised over £2 million for the Duke of Edinburgh's Award scheme.

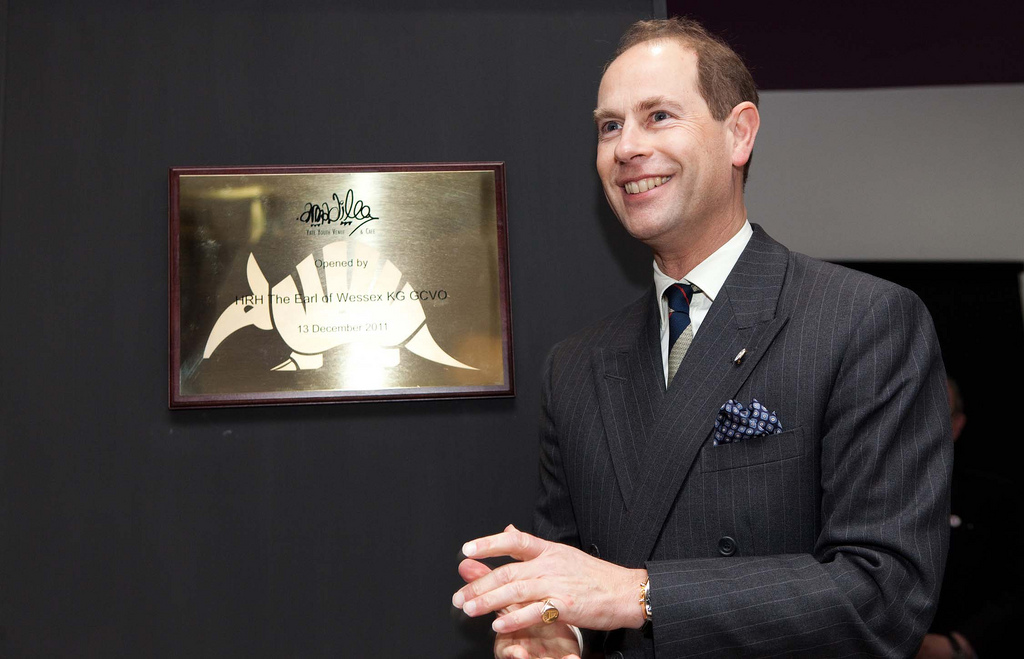
Edward opening a youth centre at Yate, Gloucestershire, in 2011

In June 2011, Edward visited Baltimore to meet students and staff of the Living Classrooms Foundation and encourage their participation in the Duke of Edinburgh's Award's programme. In December 2011, the Earl and Countess of Wessex visited troops in Afghanistan. During the same trip, the couple travelled to Bahrain, where they received two gifts of jewels from the Bahraini royal family and Prime Minister. Given concern about human rights abuses in Bahrain, the gifts attracted controversy, with calls for the jewels to be sold, and the proceeds used for the benefit of the Bahraini people.

In February and March 2012, the Earl and Countess visited the Caribbean as part of the Queen's Diamond Jubilee. Their itinerary included Saint Lucia; Barbados, Saint Vincent and the Grenadines; Grenada; Trinidad and Tobago; Montserrat; Saint Kitts and Nevis; Anguilla; Antigua and Barbuda. Highlights of the tour included attending Independence Day celebrations in Saint Lucia, addressing a joint sitting of the Senate and House of Assembly in Barbados, and visiting areas affected by volcanic eruptions in Montserrat.

In 2013, the couple visited South Africa. The Queen appointed the Earl of Wessex as Lord High Commissioner to the General Assembly of the Church of Scotland for 2014. In 2015, in recognition of his contributions to projects associated with badminton, Edward received the President's Medal from the Badminton World Federation President Poul-Erik Høyer.

In May 2016, the Earl visited Ghana, where he joined President Mahama in presenting young people with the Head of State Awards for their participation in the Duke of Edinburgh's International Award Scheme. In September 2016, Edward travelled to Chile as part of the Duke of Edinburgh's Award's diamond anniversary and visited projects run by the British and Commonwealth Fire and Rescue Company and Chilean-British Culture University, of which he is an honorary member and patron respectively.

The Earl and Countess of Wessex represented the Queen at the 50th anniversary celebrations of Sultan Hassanal Bolkiah's accession to the throne of Brunei in October 2017. In February 2018, they toured Sri Lanka, taking part in the 70th Independence Day celebrations in Colombo. In April 2018, the Earl visited Australia to attend the XXI Commonwealth Games and to support fundraising events for participants in the Duke of Edinburgh Award challenges.

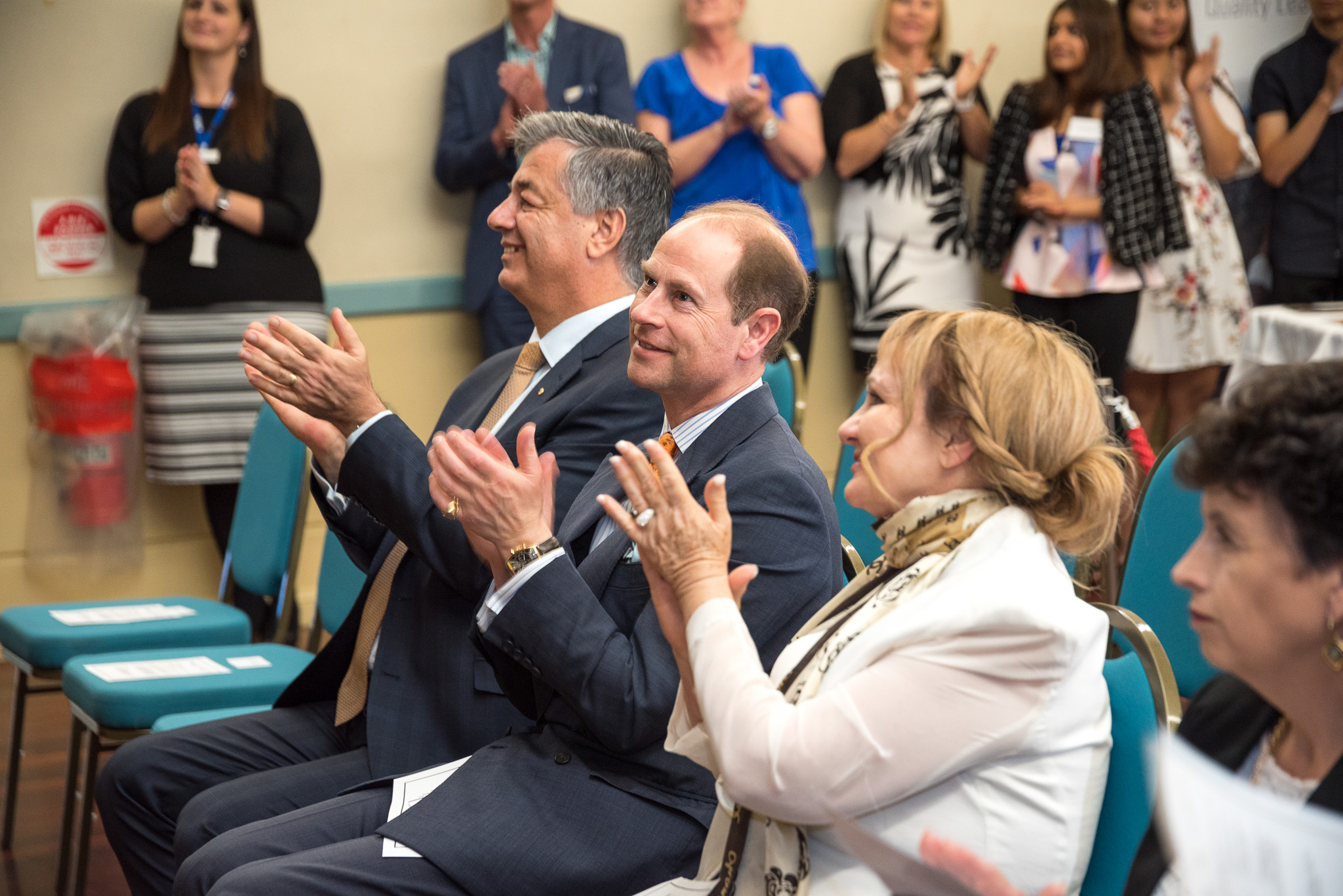
Edward visiting a youth theatre programme in Salisbury, Australia

In July 2019, the Earl and Countess of Wessex visited Forfar on their first official visit to the royal burgh since the Queen granted Edward the additional title Earl of Forfar in March 2019. The Earl was presented with 'Earl of Forfar' tartan, designed by Forfar's Strathmore Woollen Company to mark their new titles. In 2020, he took over the patronage of London Youth from his father, who had held the position for 73 years.

In February 2022, Edward was appointed president of the Royal Windsor Horse Show, a position previously held by his father Prince Philip. The following month, he visited Kenya to oversee the progress of the Duke of Edinburgh's International Award in the country. In April 2022, the Earl and Countess of Wessex and Forfar toured Saint Lucia, Saint Vincent and the Grenadines, and Antigua and Barbuda to mark the Queen's Platinum Jubilee. Their planned visit to Grenada was postponed after discussions with the island's government and governor-general, and the couple expressed their hope to visit at a later date. In 2022, and in recognition of his role as patron of the Production Guild, the Earl of Wessex Award was created as part of the Guild's inaugural Talent Showcase to recognise UK film and television organisations that had developed "a successful way of inspiring local talent or skills, widening access or being more inclusive."

After he was created Duke of Edinburgh on his 59th birthday, Edward and Sophie visited Edinburgh to meet members of the Ukrainian and Eastern European communities in the city, including those displaced following the Russian invasion of Ukraine. Edward became patron of the Duke of Edinburgh's Award upon being raised to the dukedom. In 2024, he served as Lord High Commissioner to the General Assembly of the Church of Scotland, and was succeeded in the role the following year by Lady Elish Angiolini. In 2025, Edward represented the King and the UK Government on several overseas trips, including a visit to Papua New Guinea to celebrate the 50th anniversary of independence, and a trip to Japan with Sophie.

== In the media ==
In 1999, Edward was criticised by Labour MPs John Cryer and Lindsay Hoyle for comments he made during an interview with The New York Times, in which he stated that in Britain "They [the British media] hate anyone who succeeds" and "America is where the money is". The criticism prompted him to issue a statement clarifying "that offending the British public was the very last thing I would have wanted to do".

In 2011, close associates of Jonathan Rees, a private investigator connected to the News International phone hacking scandal, alleged that he had accessed the bank accounts of Edward and Sophie and sold information about them to the Sunday Mirror.

== Titles, styles, honours and arms ==
Royal monogram of Prince Edward

=== Titles and styles ===
Until his marriage, Edward was known as "His Royal Highness The Prince Edward". On 19 June 1999, he became "His Royal Highness The Earl of Wessex". At the time of his marriage, Buckingham Palace announced the intention that Edward would eventually be created Duke of Edinburgh, a title then held by his father, Prince Philip, once it had merged in the Crown following the death of both his parents. On 10 March 2019, his 55th birthday, Edward was granted the additional title of Earl of Forfar for use in Scotland. On his 59th birthday, 10 March 2023, Edward was created Duke of Edinburgh, thus becoming "His Royal Highness The Duke of Edinburgh". His ducal title is not hereditary and will revert to the Crown on his death.

In 1994, the Independent Royalist Party of Estonia, which aspired to establish a monarchy in the country, sent a letter to Queen Elizabeth II requesting permission to crown Edward as King of Estonia. The letter described Edward as a "young British prince much admired by Estonians", and stated that the party "would be most honoured if you would accept this rare request". Buckingham Palace declined, calling it "a charming idea but a rather unlikely one".

=== Honours ===
Edward is a Royal Knight Companion of the Most Noble Order of the Garter, an Extra Knight of the Most Ancient and Most Noble Order of the Thistle, a Knight Grand Cross of the Royal Victorian Order, and a Personal Aide-de-Camp to the Sovereign. In 2013, he received an Honorary Doctorate from the University of Bath.

=== Arms ===
Coat of arms of the Duke of Edinburgh
Notes The Duke's personal coat of arms is the royal arms with a label for difference Adopted 1983 Coronet That of a son of the Sovereign Crest The Coronet of a son of a Sovereign Proper, thereon a Lion statant gardant Or crowned of the Same charged with a Label as in the Arms. Escutcheon Quarterly, 1st and 4th, Gules three Lions passant guardant in pale Or armed and langed Azure; 2nd, Or a Lion rampant Gules armed and langued Azure within a Double Tressure flory counterflory of the Second; 3rd, Azure a Harp Or stringed Argent; over all a Label Argent, charged on the centre point with a Tudor Rose. Supporters Dexter, a Lion rampant gardant Or imperially crowned Proper; Sinister, a Unicorn Argent, armed, crined and unguled Or, gorged with a Coronet Or composed of Crosses pattées and Fleurs de lis a Chain affixed thereto passing between the forelegs and reflexed over the back also Or. Orders The Garter circlet; motto: Honi soit qui mal y pense (Shame be to him who thinks evil of it). Other elements As Master of the Gardeners' and Fuellers' Companies, Prince Edward could impale his livery company arms (dexter) with his personal arms (sinister). Banner The Royal Standard of the United Kingdom labelled for difference as in his Arms. The Royal Standard in Scotland labelled for difference as in his Arms. The Royal Arms of Canada defaced with a blue Roundel surrounded by a Wreath of Gold Maple Leaves within which is a depiction of an "E" surmounted by a Royal Coronet, and above the Roundel is a white Label of three points, the centre one charged with a Tudor Rose. Symbolism As in the Royal Arms of the United Kingdom, the first and fourth quarterings are the arms of England, the second of Scotland and the third of Ireland. Other versions Scottish version of the Duke's arms as a Knight of the Order of the Thistle.

== Ancestry ==
Ancestors of Prince Edward, Duke of Edinburgh

8. George I of Greece
4. Prince Andrew of Greece and Denmark
9. Grand Duchess Olga Constantinovna of Russia
2. Prince Philip, Duke of Edinburgh
10. Prince Louis of Battenberg
5. Princess Alice of Battenberg
11. Princess Victoria of Hesse and by Rhine
1. Prince Edward, Duke of Edinburgh
12. George V of the United Kingdom
6. George VI of the United Kingdom
13. Princess Victoria Mary of Teck
3. Elizabeth II of the United Kingdom
14. Claude Bowes-Lyon, 14th Earl of Strathmore and Kinghorne
7. Lady Elizabeth Bowes-Lyon
15. Cecilia Cavendish-Bentinck

== Filmography ==
Television
Year	Title	Role
1996	Edward on Edward	host, associate producer
1996	Castle Ghosts of Scotland	executive producer
1996	Castle Ghosts of Ireland	executive producer
1997	Network First	producer (1 episode)
1998	Crown and Country	host, executive producer
1999	Stars Over Mississippi	executive producer
2000	When Cameras Cross the Line	executive producer
2000	Once Upon a Christmas	producer
2001	Tales from the Tower	executive producer
2001	Varian's War	executive producer
2001	Twice Upon a Christmas	executive producer
2003	Out of the Ashes	executive producer
2015	Whatever Happened to the Windsors?	narrator

== Notes ==
Prince Edward, Duke of Edinburgh House of Windsor Born: 10 March 1964
Lines of succession
Preceded by Adelaide Brooksbank	Succession to the British throne 16th in line	Followed by Earl of Wessex
Peerage of the United Kingdom
New creation	Earl of Wessex; 1999–present	Incumbent; Heir: Earl of Wessex
New creation	Earl of Forfar; 2019–present	Incumbent; Heir: Earl of Wessex
New creation	Duke of Edinburgh; 2023–present	Incumbent; Heir: none (Life peerage)
Orders of precedence in the United Kingdom
Preceded by Andrew Mountbatten-Windsor	Gentlemen; HRH The Duke of Edinburgh	Followed by Earl of Wessex
Academic offices
Preceded by The Lord Tugendhat	Chancellor of the University of Bath; 2013–present	Incumbent
